

503001–503100 

|-bgcolor=#d6d6d6
| 503001 ||  || — || October 9, 2012 || Haleakala || Pan-STARRS ||  || align=right | 2.7 km || 
|-id=002 bgcolor=#d6d6d6
| 503002 ||  || — || February 11, 2004 || Kitt Peak || Spacewatch ||  || align=right | 2.6 km || 
|-id=003 bgcolor=#d6d6d6
| 503003 ||  || — || October 25, 2012 || Mount Lemmon || Mount Lemmon Survey || VER || align=right | 2.6 km || 
|-id=004 bgcolor=#E9E9E9
| 503004 ||  || — || December 11, 2004 || Kitt Peak || Spacewatch ||  || align=right | 2.7 km || 
|-id=005 bgcolor=#E9E9E9
| 503005 ||  || — || January 17, 2010 || Kitt Peak || Spacewatch ||  || align=right | 1.9 km || 
|-id=006 bgcolor=#d6d6d6
| 503006 ||  || — || December 21, 2008 || Kitt Peak || Spacewatch || EOS || align=right | 2.3 km || 
|-id=007 bgcolor=#d6d6d6
| 503007 ||  || — || January 15, 2004 || Kitt Peak || Spacewatch || EOS || align=right | 1.6 km || 
|-id=008 bgcolor=#d6d6d6
| 503008 ||  || — || September 10, 2007 || Kitt Peak || Spacewatch ||  || align=right | 2.5 km || 
|-id=009 bgcolor=#d6d6d6
| 503009 ||  || — || November 8, 2007 || Mount Lemmon || Mount Lemmon Survey || VER || align=right | 3.3 km || 
|-id=010 bgcolor=#E9E9E9
| 503010 ||  || — || May 2, 2010 || WISE || WISE ||  || align=right | 1.9 km || 
|-id=011 bgcolor=#d6d6d6
| 503011 ||  || — || September 15, 2007 || Anderson Mesa || LONEOS ||  || align=right | 4.4 km || 
|-id=012 bgcolor=#E9E9E9
| 503012 ||  || — || March 16, 2007 || Kitt Peak || Spacewatch ||  || align=right data-sort-value="0.97" | 970 m || 
|-id=013 bgcolor=#d6d6d6
| 503013 ||  || — || October 23, 2012 || Haleakala || Pan-STARRS || EUP || align=right | 3.0 km || 
|-id=014 bgcolor=#C2FFFF
| 503014 ||  || — || August 10, 2007 || Kitt Peak || Spacewatch || L4 || align=right | 8.5 km || 
|-id=015 bgcolor=#E9E9E9
| 503015 ||  || — || October 11, 2005 || Kitt Peak || Spacewatch ||  || align=right data-sort-value="0.87" | 870 m || 
|-id=016 bgcolor=#d6d6d6
| 503016 ||  || — || October 11, 2001 || Kitt Peak || Spacewatch || EOS || align=right | 2.0 km || 
|-id=017 bgcolor=#E9E9E9
| 503017 ||  || — || February 9, 2010 || Kitt Peak || Spacewatch ||  || align=right | 3.0 km || 
|-id=018 bgcolor=#d6d6d6
| 503018 ||  || — || September 24, 1995 || Kitt Peak || Spacewatch || EOS || align=right | 1.8 km || 
|-id=019 bgcolor=#d6d6d6
| 503019 ||  || — || February 3, 2009 || Mount Lemmon || Mount Lemmon Survey ||  || align=right | 4.0 km || 
|-id=020 bgcolor=#d6d6d6
| 503020 ||  || — || March 13, 2010 || Kitt Peak || Spacewatch || EOS || align=right | 2.0 km || 
|-id=021 bgcolor=#E9E9E9
| 503021 ||  || — || December 12, 2004 || Kitt Peak || Spacewatch ||  || align=right | 3.0 km || 
|-id=022 bgcolor=#d6d6d6
| 503022 ||  || — || March 12, 2010 || Kitt Peak || Spacewatch ||  || align=right | 2.9 km || 
|-id=023 bgcolor=#E9E9E9
| 503023 ||  || — || November 2, 2013 || Catalina || CSS || MAR || align=right | 2.3 km || 
|-id=024 bgcolor=#E9E9E9
| 503024 ||  || — || March 24, 2006 || Mount Lemmon || Mount Lemmon Survey || GEF || align=right | 2.1 km || 
|-id=025 bgcolor=#d6d6d6
| 503025 ||  || — || December 29, 2013 || Haleakala || Pan-STARRS || EOS || align=right | 2.0 km || 
|-id=026 bgcolor=#d6d6d6
| 503026 ||  || — || February 5, 2009 || Kitt Peak || Spacewatch || URS || align=right | 3.4 km || 
|-id=027 bgcolor=#d6d6d6
| 503027 ||  || — || March 1, 2009 || Mount Lemmon || Mount Lemmon Survey || EOS || align=right | 2.1 km || 
|-id=028 bgcolor=#d6d6d6
| 503028 ||  || — || April 6, 2000 || Kitt Peak || Spacewatch ||  || align=right | 2.3 km || 
|-id=029 bgcolor=#d6d6d6
| 503029 ||  || — || September 19, 2006 || Kitt Peak || Spacewatch || VER || align=right | 2.9 km || 
|-id=030 bgcolor=#d6d6d6
| 503030 ||  || — || October 30, 2002 || Kitt Peak || Spacewatch ||  || align=right | 2.7 km || 
|-id=031 bgcolor=#d6d6d6
| 503031 ||  || — || January 20, 2009 || Kitt Peak || Spacewatch || THM || align=right | 2.1 km || 
|-id=032 bgcolor=#d6d6d6
| 503032 ||  || — || March 13, 2010 || Mount Lemmon || Mount Lemmon Survey ||  || align=right | 2.3 km || 
|-id=033 bgcolor=#d6d6d6
| 503033 New Hampshire ||  ||  || March 3, 2005 || Catalina || CSS ||  || align=right | 2.1 km || 
|-id=034 bgcolor=#d6d6d6
| 503034 ||  || — || November 4, 2007 || Kitt Peak || Spacewatch || HYG || align=right | 2.5 km || 
|-id=035 bgcolor=#E9E9E9
| 503035 ||  || — || February 16, 2010 || WISE || WISE ||  || align=right | 1.1 km || 
|-id=036 bgcolor=#E9E9E9
| 503036 ||  || — || March 13, 2011 || Mount Lemmon || Mount Lemmon Survey ||  || align=right data-sort-value="0.90" | 900 m || 
|-id=037 bgcolor=#E9E9E9
| 503037 ||  || — || February 21, 2006 || Catalina || CSS ||  || align=right | 1.9 km || 
|-id=038 bgcolor=#E9E9E9
| 503038 ||  || — || March 20, 2010 || WISE || WISE || (194) || align=right | 1.8 km || 
|-id=039 bgcolor=#d6d6d6
| 503039 ||  || — || September 28, 2006 || Kitt Peak || Spacewatch ||  || align=right | 2.3 km || 
|-id=040 bgcolor=#d6d6d6
| 503040 ||  || — || February 11, 2008 || Mount Lemmon || Mount Lemmon Survey || 7:4 || align=right | 2.8 km || 
|-id=041 bgcolor=#d6d6d6
| 503041 ||  || — || April 1, 2005 || Kitt Peak || Spacewatch || KOR || align=right | 1.3 km || 
|-id=042 bgcolor=#d6d6d6
| 503042 ||  || — || September 16, 2006 || Kitt Peak || Spacewatch || ELF || align=right | 3.0 km || 
|-id=043 bgcolor=#d6d6d6
| 503043 ||  || — || February 26, 2009 || Kitt Peak || Spacewatch || HYG || align=right | 2.9 km || 
|-id=044 bgcolor=#d6d6d6
| 503044 ||  || — || December 21, 2003 || Kitt Peak || Spacewatch ||  || align=right | 2.4 km || 
|-id=045 bgcolor=#E9E9E9
| 503045 ||  || — || April 4, 2011 || Kitt Peak || Spacewatch ||  || align=right data-sort-value="0.88" | 880 m || 
|-id=046 bgcolor=#d6d6d6
| 503046 ||  || — || March 3, 2009 || Catalina || CSS ||  || align=right | 3.6 km || 
|-id=047 bgcolor=#E9E9E9
| 503047 ||  || — || October 27, 2009 || Mount Lemmon || Mount Lemmon Survey ||  || align=right | 3.3 km || 
|-id=048 bgcolor=#d6d6d6
| 503048 ||  || — || August 30, 2011 || Haleakala || Pan-STARRS || URS || align=right | 2.5 km || 
|-id=049 bgcolor=#E9E9E9
| 503049 ||  || — || October 28, 2008 || Kitt Peak || Spacewatch ||  || align=right | 1.9 km || 
|-id=050 bgcolor=#E9E9E9
| 503050 ||  || — || January 7, 2002 || Kitt Peak || Spacewatch ||  || align=right | 1.1 km || 
|-id=051 bgcolor=#d6d6d6
| 503051 ||  || — || December 18, 2007 || Mount Lemmon || Mount Lemmon Survey ||  || align=right | 3.2 km || 
|-id=052 bgcolor=#E9E9E9
| 503052 ||  || — || November 10, 2004 || Kitt Peak || Spacewatch ||  || align=right | 1.4 km || 
|-id=053 bgcolor=#d6d6d6
| 503053 ||  || — || October 2, 2006 || Mount Lemmon || Mount Lemmon Survey ||  || align=right | 3.4 km || 
|-id=054 bgcolor=#d6d6d6
| 503054 ||  || — || August 22, 1995 || Kitt Peak || Spacewatch ||  || align=right | 4.2 km || 
|-id=055 bgcolor=#d6d6d6
| 503055 ||  || — || October 13, 2007 || Mount Lemmon || Mount Lemmon Survey || KOR || align=right | 1.3 km || 
|-id=056 bgcolor=#d6d6d6
| 503056 ||  || — || October 31, 2007 || Kitt Peak || Spacewatch ||  || align=right | 3.6 km || 
|-id=057 bgcolor=#E9E9E9
| 503057 ||  || — || April 20, 2006 || Kitt Peak || Spacewatch || HOF || align=right | 2.8 km || 
|-id=058 bgcolor=#E9E9E9
| 503058 ||  || — || March 13, 2010 || WISE || WISE ||  || align=right | 2.3 km || 
|-id=059 bgcolor=#E9E9E9
| 503059 ||  || — || January 12, 2010 || Mount Lemmon || Mount Lemmon Survey ||  || align=right | 2.3 km || 
|-id=060 bgcolor=#d6d6d6
| 503060 ||  || — || August 24, 2012 || Kitt Peak || Spacewatch ||  || align=right | 3.3 km || 
|-id=061 bgcolor=#E9E9E9
| 503061 ||  || — || September 27, 2003 || Kitt Peak || Spacewatch ||  || align=right | 1.9 km || 
|-id=062 bgcolor=#d6d6d6
| 503062 ||  || — || February 12, 2004 || Kitt Peak || Spacewatch ||  || align=right | 3.2 km || 
|-id=063 bgcolor=#d6d6d6
| 503063 ||  || — || August 21, 2006 || Kitt Peak || Spacewatch || VER || align=right | 3.2 km || 
|-id=064 bgcolor=#E9E9E9
| 503064 ||  || — || December 25, 2009 || Kitt Peak || Spacewatch || ADE || align=right | 1.6 km || 
|-id=065 bgcolor=#d6d6d6
| 503065 ||  || — || October 30, 2007 || Mount Lemmon || Mount Lemmon Survey ||  || align=right | 3.6 km || 
|-id=066 bgcolor=#d6d6d6
| 503066 ||  || — || December 19, 2003 || Socorro || LINEAR ||  || align=right | 3.3 km || 
|-id=067 bgcolor=#E9E9E9
| 503067 ||  || — || October 6, 2008 || Mount Lemmon || Mount Lemmon Survey ||  || align=right | 2.0 km || 
|-id=068 bgcolor=#E9E9E9
| 503068 ||  || — || March 16, 2010 || Catalina || CSS ||  || align=right | 2.2 km || 
|-id=069 bgcolor=#d6d6d6
| 503069 ||  || — || November 17, 2007 || Mount Lemmon || Mount Lemmon Survey || EOS || align=right | 3.9 km || 
|-id=070 bgcolor=#d6d6d6
| 503070 ||  || — || October 20, 2007 || Kitt Peak || Spacewatch ||  || align=right | 3.4 km || 
|-id=071 bgcolor=#E9E9E9
| 503071 ||  || — || September 23, 2008 || Socorro || LINEAR ||  || align=right | 2.7 km || 
|-id=072 bgcolor=#d6d6d6
| 503072 ||  || — || April 25, 2004 || Kitt Peak || Spacewatch || THM || align=right | 2.3 km || 
|-id=073 bgcolor=#E9E9E9
| 503073 ||  || — || February 13, 2010 || Mount Lemmon || Mount Lemmon Survey ||  || align=right | 2.1 km || 
|-id=074 bgcolor=#d6d6d6
| 503074 ||  || — || February 1, 2010 || WISE || WISE ||  || align=right | 3.8 km || 
|-id=075 bgcolor=#E9E9E9
| 503075 ||  || — || October 8, 2008 || Kitt Peak || Spacewatch || AGN || align=right | 1.4 km || 
|-id=076 bgcolor=#d6d6d6
| 503076 ||  || — || March 13, 2010 || Mount Lemmon || Mount Lemmon Survey ||  || align=right | 2.5 km || 
|-id=077 bgcolor=#E9E9E9
| 503077 ||  || — || December 18, 2009 || Kitt Peak || Spacewatch || AGN || align=right | 1.1 km || 
|-id=078 bgcolor=#E9E9E9
| 503078 ||  || — || January 7, 2010 || Kitt Peak || Spacewatch || AGN || align=right | 1.6 km || 
|-id=079 bgcolor=#d6d6d6
| 503079 ||  || — || December 22, 2008 || Kitt Peak || Spacewatch || THM || align=right | 2.1 km || 
|-id=080 bgcolor=#d6d6d6
| 503080 ||  || — || February 14, 2009 || Mount Lemmon || Mount Lemmon Survey ||  || align=right | 2.7 km || 
|-id=081 bgcolor=#E9E9E9
| 503081 ||  || — || May 22, 2011 || Mount Lemmon || Mount Lemmon Survey ||  || align=right | 2.7 km || 
|-id=082 bgcolor=#E9E9E9
| 503082 ||  || — || January 13, 2002 || Socorro || LINEAR ||  || align=right | 1.9 km || 
|-id=083 bgcolor=#E9E9E9
| 503083 ||  || — || November 11, 2004 || Catalina || CSS || JUN || align=right | 1.3 km || 
|-id=084 bgcolor=#E9E9E9
| 503084 ||  || — || May 22, 2011 || Mount Lemmon || Mount Lemmon Survey ||  || align=right | 1.6 km || 
|-id=085 bgcolor=#d6d6d6
| 503085 ||  || — || October 8, 2012 || Mount Lemmon || Mount Lemmon Survey ||  || align=right | 2.7 km || 
|-id=086 bgcolor=#d6d6d6
| 503086 ||  || — || February 15, 2010 || WISE || WISE ||  || align=right | 2.1 km || 
|-id=087 bgcolor=#E9E9E9
| 503087 ||  || — || April 25, 2007 || Mount Lemmon || Mount Lemmon Survey ||  || align=right data-sort-value="0.96" | 960 m || 
|-id=088 bgcolor=#d6d6d6
| 503088 ||  || — || January 28, 2015 || Haleakala || Pan-STARRS ||  || align=right | 2.3 km || 
|-id=089 bgcolor=#d6d6d6
| 503089 ||  || — || February 10, 2014 || Haleakala || Pan-STARRS ||  || align=right | 3.7 km || 
|-id=090 bgcolor=#d6d6d6
| 503090 ||  || — || October 22, 2012 || Mount Lemmon || Mount Lemmon Survey ||  || align=right | 3.1 km || 
|-id=091 bgcolor=#d6d6d6
| 503091 ||  || — || March 14, 2010 || WISE || WISE || EOS || align=right | 2.3 km || 
|-id=092 bgcolor=#d6d6d6
| 503092 ||  || — || March 27, 2004 || Socorro || LINEAR ||  || align=right | 2.5 km || 
|-id=093 bgcolor=#d6d6d6
| 503093 ||  || — || December 22, 2008 || Mount Lemmon || Mount Lemmon Survey ||  || align=right | 2.6 km || 
|-id=094 bgcolor=#E9E9E9
| 503094 ||  || — || May 12, 2007 || Kitt Peak || Spacewatch ||  || align=right | 2.8 km || 
|-id=095 bgcolor=#d6d6d6
| 503095 ||  || — || February 2, 2009 || Mount Lemmon || Mount Lemmon Survey || EOS || align=right | 1.8 km || 
|-id=096 bgcolor=#fefefe
| 503096 ||  || — || November 18, 2008 || La Sagra || OAM Obs. || H || align=right data-sort-value="0.75" | 750 m || 
|-id=097 bgcolor=#d6d6d6
| 503097 ||  || — || December 16, 2007 || Mount Lemmon || Mount Lemmon Survey || EOS || align=right | 2.2 km || 
|-id=098 bgcolor=#E9E9E9
| 503098 ||  || — || February 2, 2006 || Mount Lemmon || Mount Lemmon Survey ||  || align=right | 2.1 km || 
|-id=099 bgcolor=#E9E9E9
| 503099 ||  || — || January 22, 2006 || Catalina || CSS || ADE || align=right | 2.6 km || 
|-id=100 bgcolor=#d6d6d6
| 503100 ||  || — || January 29, 2009 || Mount Lemmon || Mount Lemmon Survey || EOS || align=right | 3.0 km || 
|}

503101–503200 

|-bgcolor=#E9E9E9
| 503101 ||  || — || December 18, 2009 || Kitt Peak || Spacewatch ||  || align=right | 1.3 km || 
|-id=102 bgcolor=#d6d6d6
| 503102 ||  || — || October 8, 2007 || Kitt Peak || Spacewatch ||  || align=right | 3.1 km || 
|-id=103 bgcolor=#E9E9E9
| 503103 ||  || — || February 5, 2006 || Mount Lemmon || Mount Lemmon Survey ||  || align=right | 1.5 km || 
|-id=104 bgcolor=#d6d6d6
| 503104 ||  || — || October 8, 2012 || Haleakala || Pan-STARRS ||  || align=right | 2.8 km || 
|-id=105 bgcolor=#d6d6d6
| 503105 ||  || — || September 10, 2007 || Kitt Peak || Spacewatch ||  || align=right | 3.1 km || 
|-id=106 bgcolor=#d6d6d6
| 503106 ||  || — || November 16, 2006 || Kitt Peak || Spacewatch || HYG || align=right | 3.1 km || 
|-id=107 bgcolor=#E9E9E9
| 503107 ||  || — || February 2, 2006 || Kitt Peak || Spacewatch ||  || align=right | 2.7 km || 
|-id=108 bgcolor=#d6d6d6
| 503108 ||  || — || July 1, 2011 || Kitt Peak || Spacewatch ||  || align=right | 2.4 km || 
|-id=109 bgcolor=#d6d6d6
| 503109 ||  || — || January 17, 2009 || Kitt Peak || Spacewatch ||  || align=right | 2.7 km || 
|-id=110 bgcolor=#d6d6d6
| 503110 ||  || — || October 8, 2012 || Haleakala || Pan-STARRS || EOS || align=right | 1.8 km || 
|-id=111 bgcolor=#d6d6d6
| 503111 ||  || — || March 14, 2004 || Kitt Peak || Spacewatch ||  || align=right | 2.5 km || 
|-id=112 bgcolor=#E9E9E9
| 503112 ||  || — || March 12, 2011 || Mount Lemmon || Mount Lemmon Survey ||  || align=right data-sort-value="0.85" | 850 m || 
|-id=113 bgcolor=#d6d6d6
| 503113 ||  || — || September 20, 2006 || Catalina || CSS ||  || align=right | 3.3 km || 
|-id=114 bgcolor=#d6d6d6
| 503114 ||  || — || May 7, 2010 || Mount Lemmon || Mount Lemmon Survey ||  || align=right | 3.5 km || 
|-id=115 bgcolor=#d6d6d6
| 503115 ||  || — || April 17, 2005 || Kitt Peak || Spacewatch ||  || align=right | 2.4 km || 
|-id=116 bgcolor=#d6d6d6
| 503116 ||  || — || April 10, 2010 || Kitt Peak || Spacewatch || EOS || align=right | 1.7 km || 
|-id=117 bgcolor=#d6d6d6
| 503117 ||  || — || November 18, 2007 || Mount Lemmon || Mount Lemmon Survey ||  || align=right | 3.9 km || 
|-id=118 bgcolor=#E9E9E9
| 503118 ||  || — || November 17, 2009 || Kitt Peak || Spacewatch ||  || align=right | 1.0 km || 
|-id=119 bgcolor=#d6d6d6
| 503119 ||  || — || September 18, 2006 || Kitt Peak || Spacewatch ||  || align=right | 2.6 km || 
|-id=120 bgcolor=#d6d6d6
| 503120 ||  || — || January 16, 2010 || WISE || WISE ||  || align=right | 6.2 km || 
|-id=121 bgcolor=#d6d6d6
| 503121 ||  || — || August 24, 2011 || Haleakala || Pan-STARRS || VER || align=right | 2.4 km || 
|-id=122 bgcolor=#d6d6d6
| 503122 ||  || — || January 17, 2009 || Kitt Peak || Spacewatch || HYG || align=right | 3.0 km || 
|-id=123 bgcolor=#E9E9E9
| 503123 ||  || — || September 28, 2003 || Kitt Peak || Spacewatch ||  || align=right | 3.0 km || 
|-id=124 bgcolor=#E9E9E9
| 503124 ||  || — || September 30, 2003 || Kitt Peak || Spacewatch || HOF || align=right | 3.8 km || 
|-id=125 bgcolor=#E9E9E9
| 503125 ||  || — || November 10, 2013 || Kitt Peak || Spacewatch || CLO || align=right | 1.9 km || 
|-id=126 bgcolor=#fefefe
| 503126 ||  || — || September 28, 2013 || Haleakala || Pan-STARRS || H || align=right data-sort-value="0.91" | 910 m || 
|-id=127 bgcolor=#E9E9E9
| 503127 ||  || — || March 2, 2006 || Kitt Peak || Spacewatch ||  || align=right | 2.2 km || 
|-id=128 bgcolor=#d6d6d6
| 503128 ||  || — || December 31, 2008 || Catalina || CSS ||  || align=right | 4.4 km || 
|-id=129 bgcolor=#E9E9E9
| 503129 ||  || — || July 28, 2008 || Mount Lemmon || Mount Lemmon Survey || EUN || align=right | 1.3 km || 
|-id=130 bgcolor=#d6d6d6
| 503130 ||  || — || December 4, 2008 || Kitt Peak || Spacewatch || EOS || align=right | 3.1 km || 
|-id=131 bgcolor=#d6d6d6
| 503131 ||  || — || September 18, 2007 || Catalina || CSS || EOS || align=right | 2.4 km || 
|-id=132 bgcolor=#d6d6d6
| 503132 ||  || — || January 16, 2009 || Kitt Peak || Spacewatch ||  || align=right | 3.8 km || 
|-id=133 bgcolor=#d6d6d6
| 503133 ||  || — || January 8, 2009 || Kitt Peak || Spacewatch ||  || align=right | 2.7 km || 
|-id=134 bgcolor=#d6d6d6
| 503134 ||  || — || November 9, 2007 || Mount Lemmon || Mount Lemmon Survey ||  || align=right | 2.7 km || 
|-id=135 bgcolor=#d6d6d6
| 503135 ||  || — || August 30, 2006 || Anderson Mesa || LONEOS ||  || align=right | 3.3 km || 
|-id=136 bgcolor=#d6d6d6
| 503136 ||  || — || February 23, 2010 || WISE || WISE ||  || align=right | 3.7 km || 
|-id=137 bgcolor=#d6d6d6
| 503137 ||  || — || October 11, 2012 || Mount Lemmon || Mount Lemmon Survey ||  || align=right | 2.2 km || 
|-id=138 bgcolor=#d6d6d6
| 503138 ||  || — || March 8, 2005 || Mount Lemmon || Mount Lemmon Survey || KAR || align=right | 2.0 km || 
|-id=139 bgcolor=#d6d6d6
| 503139 ||  || — || August 29, 2006 || Catalina || CSS ||  || align=right | 2.9 km || 
|-id=140 bgcolor=#d6d6d6
| 503140 ||  || — || September 25, 2006 || Mount Lemmon || Mount Lemmon Survey ||  || align=right | 2.5 km || 
|-id=141 bgcolor=#d6d6d6
| 503141 ||  || — || March 3, 2009 || Catalina || CSS ||  || align=right | 3.7 km || 
|-id=142 bgcolor=#d6d6d6
| 503142 ||  || — || December 31, 2008 || Kitt Peak || Spacewatch ||  || align=right | 2.1 km || 
|-id=143 bgcolor=#d6d6d6
| 503143 ||  || — || September 17, 2012 || Kitt Peak || Spacewatch || NAE || align=right | 2.0 km || 
|-id=144 bgcolor=#d6d6d6
| 503144 ||  || — || March 8, 2005 || Mount Lemmon || Mount Lemmon Survey || KOR || align=right | 2.0 km || 
|-id=145 bgcolor=#d6d6d6
| 503145 ||  || — || February 28, 2009 || Kitt Peak || Spacewatch ||  || align=right | 2.5 km || 
|-id=146 bgcolor=#d6d6d6
| 503146 ||  || — || March 4, 2005 || Mount Lemmon || Mount Lemmon Survey || KAR || align=right | 2.1 km || 
|-id=147 bgcolor=#d6d6d6
| 503147 ||  || — || December 21, 1997 || Kitt Peak || Spacewatch ||  || align=right | 2.5 km || 
|-id=148 bgcolor=#d6d6d6
| 503148 ||  || — || November 13, 2007 || Mount Lemmon || Mount Lemmon Survey ||  || align=right | 2.7 km || 
|-id=149 bgcolor=#d6d6d6
| 503149 ||  || — || November 4, 2007 || Kitt Peak || Spacewatch || URS || align=right | 3.5 km || 
|-id=150 bgcolor=#d6d6d6
| 503150 ||  || — || December 31, 2013 || Kitt Peak || Spacewatch ||  || align=right | 3.1 km || 
|-id=151 bgcolor=#d6d6d6
| 503151 ||  || — || April 10, 2010 || Mount Lemmon || Mount Lemmon Survey ||  || align=right | 2.6 km || 
|-id=152 bgcolor=#d6d6d6
| 503152 ||  || — || September 16, 2006 || Kitt Peak || Spacewatch || EOS || align=right | 3.0 km || 
|-id=153 bgcolor=#d6d6d6
| 503153 ||  || — || September 20, 1995 || Kitt Peak || Spacewatch ||  || align=right | 3.9 km || 
|-id=154 bgcolor=#d6d6d6
| 503154 ||  || — || September 11, 2007 || Mount Lemmon || Mount Lemmon Survey || KAR || align=right | 2.1 km || 
|-id=155 bgcolor=#d6d6d6
| 503155 ||  || — || March 15, 2004 || Kitt Peak || Spacewatch || THM || align=right | 2.3 km || 
|-id=156 bgcolor=#d6d6d6
| 503156 ||  || — || March 1, 2009 || Kitt Peak || Spacewatch || URS || align=right | 2.8 km || 
|-id=157 bgcolor=#d6d6d6
| 503157 ||  || — || May 3, 2005 || Kitt Peak || Spacewatch || EOS || align=right | 2.3 km || 
|-id=158 bgcolor=#d6d6d6
| 503158 ||  || — || July 27, 2011 || Haleakala || Pan-STARRS ||  || align=right | 2.6 km || 
|-id=159 bgcolor=#d6d6d6
| 503159 ||  || — || February 3, 2009 || Mount Lemmon || Mount Lemmon Survey ||  || align=right | 2.5 km || 
|-id=160 bgcolor=#E9E9E9
| 503160 ||  || — || June 11, 2010 || WISE || WISE || PAL || align=right | 3.1 km || 
|-id=161 bgcolor=#d6d6d6
| 503161 ||  || — || May 4, 2009 || Mount Lemmon || Mount Lemmon Survey || SYL7:4 || align=right | 3.8 km || 
|-id=162 bgcolor=#d6d6d6
| 503162 ||  || — || October 17, 2012 || Haleakala || Pan-STARRS ||  || align=right | 2.5 km || 
|-id=163 bgcolor=#E9E9E9
| 503163 ||  || — || January 16, 2005 || Kitt Peak || Spacewatch ||  || align=right | 2.5 km || 
|-id=164 bgcolor=#d6d6d6
| 503164 ||  || — || March 16, 2004 || Kitt Peak || Spacewatch || EOS || align=right | 3.6 km || 
|-id=165 bgcolor=#d6d6d6
| 503165 ||  || — || December 22, 2008 || Mount Lemmon || Mount Lemmon Survey ||  || align=right | 2.5 km || 
|-id=166 bgcolor=#d6d6d6
| 503166 ||  || — || December 19, 2003 || Kitt Peak || Spacewatch ||  || align=right | 2.3 km || 
|-id=167 bgcolor=#d6d6d6
| 503167 ||  || — || January 25, 2009 || Kitt Peak || Spacewatch ||  || align=right | 2.4 km || 
|-id=168 bgcolor=#E9E9E9
| 503168 ||  || — || December 15, 2004 || Socorro || LINEAR ||  || align=right | 2.6 km || 
|-id=169 bgcolor=#d6d6d6
| 503169 ||  || — || October 20, 2007 || Mount Lemmon || Mount Lemmon Survey || EOS || align=right | 3.0 km || 
|-id=170 bgcolor=#E9E9E9
| 503170 ||  || — || January 26, 2006 || Mount Lemmon || Mount Lemmon Survey || EUN || align=right | 1.8 km || 
|-id=171 bgcolor=#d6d6d6
| 503171 ||  || — || November 2, 2007 || Mount Lemmon || Mount Lemmon Survey ||  || align=right | 3.1 km || 
|-id=172 bgcolor=#E9E9E9
| 503172 ||  || — || March 3, 2005 || Kitt Peak || Spacewatch || AGN || align=right | 2.6 km || 
|-id=173 bgcolor=#d6d6d6
| 503173 ||  || — || October 15, 2006 || Kitt Peak || Spacewatch ||  || align=right | 3.2 km || 
|-id=174 bgcolor=#E9E9E9
| 503174 ||  || — || February 13, 2010 || Socorro || LINEAR ||  || align=right | 2.5 km || 
|-id=175 bgcolor=#d6d6d6
| 503175 ||  || — || March 1, 2009 || Kitt Peak || Spacewatch ||  || align=right | 2.6 km || 
|-id=176 bgcolor=#E9E9E9
| 503176 ||  || — || October 8, 2008 || Catalina || CSS || GEF || align=right | 3.1 km || 
|-id=177 bgcolor=#d6d6d6
| 503177 ||  || — || October 30, 2007 || Kitt Peak || Spacewatch || EOS || align=right | 2.2 km || 
|-id=178 bgcolor=#d6d6d6
| 503178 ||  || — || December 4, 2008 || Kitt Peak || Spacewatch ||  || align=right | 2.1 km || 
|-id=179 bgcolor=#d6d6d6
| 503179 ||  || — || March 19, 2009 || Mount Lemmon || Mount Lemmon Survey || EUP || align=right | 3.3 km || 
|-id=180 bgcolor=#d6d6d6
| 503180 ||  || — || October 20, 2007 || Mount Lemmon || Mount Lemmon Survey ||  || align=right | 2.8 km || 
|-id=181 bgcolor=#d6d6d6
| 503181 ||  || — || November 9, 2007 || Kitt Peak || Spacewatch ||  || align=right | 2.7 km || 
|-id=182 bgcolor=#d6d6d6
| 503182 ||  || — || October 17, 2012 || Haleakala || Pan-STARRS ||  || align=right | 3.1 km || 
|-id=183 bgcolor=#E9E9E9
| 503183 ||  || — || May 24, 2006 || Kitt Peak || Spacewatch ||  || align=right | 2.6 km || 
|-id=184 bgcolor=#d6d6d6
| 503184 ||  || — || January 18, 2009 || Mount Lemmon || Mount Lemmon Survey ||  || align=right | 2.7 km || 
|-id=185 bgcolor=#d6d6d6
| 503185 ||  || — || October 7, 2012 || Haleakala || Pan-STARRS ||  || align=right | 3.0 km || 
|-id=186 bgcolor=#d6d6d6
| 503186 ||  || — || January 12, 2008 || Kitt Peak || Spacewatch ||  || align=right | 2.9 km || 
|-id=187 bgcolor=#d6d6d6
| 503187 ||  || — || November 3, 2007 || Kitt Peak || Spacewatch ||  || align=right | 3.0 km || 
|-id=188 bgcolor=#E9E9E9
| 503188 ||  || — || September 26, 2008 || Mount Lemmon || Mount Lemmon Survey ||  || align=right | 1.9 km || 
|-id=189 bgcolor=#d6d6d6
| 503189 ||  || — || November 30, 2008 || Kitt Peak || Spacewatch ||  || align=right | 2.6 km || 
|-id=190 bgcolor=#d6d6d6
| 503190 ||  || — || September 16, 2006 || Kitt Peak || Spacewatch ||  || align=right | 3.0 km || 
|-id=191 bgcolor=#d6d6d6
| 503191 ||  || — || August 29, 2006 || Kitt Peak || Spacewatch ||  || align=right | 4.6 km || 
|-id=192 bgcolor=#d6d6d6
| 503192 ||  || — || November 9, 2007 || Kitt Peak || Spacewatch ||  || align=right | 2.9 km || 
|-id=193 bgcolor=#E9E9E9
| 503193 ||  || — || March 2, 2001 || Kitt Peak || Spacewatch ||  || align=right | 3.5 km || 
|-id=194 bgcolor=#d6d6d6
| 503194 ||  || — || December 21, 2008 || Mount Lemmon || Mount Lemmon Survey ||  || align=right | 4.1 km || 
|-id=195 bgcolor=#E9E9E9
| 503195 ||  || — || September 3, 2008 || Kitt Peak || Spacewatch ||  || align=right | 2.8 km || 
|-id=196 bgcolor=#fefefe
| 503196 ||  || — || April 7, 2000 || Anderson Mesa || LONEOS ||  || align=right | 1.0 km || 
|-id=197 bgcolor=#fefefe
| 503197 ||  || — || September 1, 2013 || XuYi || PMO NEO || H || align=right data-sort-value="0.69" | 690 m || 
|-id=198 bgcolor=#d6d6d6
| 503198 ||  || — || October 10, 2007 || Mount Lemmon || Mount Lemmon Survey ||  || align=right | 4.1 km || 
|-id=199 bgcolor=#d6d6d6
| 503199 ||  || — || April 10, 2010 || Mount Lemmon || Mount Lemmon Survey ||  || align=right | 2.7 km || 
|-id=200 bgcolor=#d6d6d6
| 503200 ||  || — || February 20, 2014 || Haleakala || Pan-STARRS || EOS || align=right | 3.3 km || 
|}

503201–503300 

|-bgcolor=#E9E9E9
| 503201 ||  || — || January 15, 2011 || Catalina || CSS ||  || align=right | 1.4 km || 
|-id=202 bgcolor=#d6d6d6
| 503202 ||  || — || June 26, 1995 || Kitt Peak || Spacewatch ||  || align=right | 3.2 km || 
|-id=203 bgcolor=#d6d6d6
| 503203 ||  || — || September 18, 2006 || Kitt Peak || Spacewatch ||  || align=right | 2.9 km || 
|-id=204 bgcolor=#E9E9E9
| 503204 ||  || — || October 26, 2013 || Kitt Peak || Spacewatch ||  || align=right | 1.5 km || 
|-id=205 bgcolor=#d6d6d6
| 503205 ||  || — || November 4, 2007 || Kitt Peak || Spacewatch ||  || align=right | 2.6 km || 
|-id=206 bgcolor=#d6d6d6
| 503206 ||  || — || May 26, 2009 || Mount Lemmon || Mount Lemmon Survey || ULA7:4 || align=right | 3.2 km || 
|-id=207 bgcolor=#d6d6d6
| 503207 ||  || — || September 17, 2012 || Kitt Peak || Spacewatch ||  || align=right | 2.7 km || 
|-id=208 bgcolor=#d6d6d6
| 503208 ||  || — || November 20, 2003 || Kitt Peak || Spacewatch ||  || align=right | 3.0 km || 
|-id=209 bgcolor=#d6d6d6
| 503209 ||  || — || October 20, 2007 || Mount Lemmon || Mount Lemmon Survey || NAE || align=right | 3.5 km || 
|-id=210 bgcolor=#d6d6d6
| 503210 ||  || — || September 18, 2006 || Kitt Peak || Spacewatch ||  || align=right | 3.0 km || 
|-id=211 bgcolor=#d6d6d6
| 503211 ||  || — || April 8, 2010 || Kitt Peak || Spacewatch || EOS || align=right | 2.7 km || 
|-id=212 bgcolor=#d6d6d6
| 503212 ||  || — || May 1, 2004 || Kitt Peak || Spacewatch ||  || align=right | 3.7 km || 
|-id=213 bgcolor=#d6d6d6
| 503213 ||  || — || January 11, 2014 || Kitt Peak || Spacewatch ||  || align=right | 2.3 km || 
|-id=214 bgcolor=#d6d6d6
| 503214 ||  || — || April 11, 2010 || WISE || WISE ||  || align=right | 4.5 km || 
|-id=215 bgcolor=#d6d6d6
| 503215 ||  || — || March 1, 2009 || Catalina || CSS ||  || align=right | 3.2 km || 
|-id=216 bgcolor=#d6d6d6
| 503216 ||  || — || March 29, 2004 || Socorro || LINEAR ||  || align=right | 5.1 km || 
|-id=217 bgcolor=#E9E9E9
| 503217 ||  || — || February 4, 2002 || Anderson Mesa || LONEOS ||  || align=right data-sort-value="0.83" | 830 m || 
|-id=218 bgcolor=#d6d6d6
| 503218 ||  || — || August 25, 2001 || Socorro || LINEAR ||  || align=right | 3.4 km || 
|-id=219 bgcolor=#d6d6d6
| 503219 ||  || — || November 2, 2007 || Kitt Peak || Spacewatch ||  || align=right | 3.3 km || 
|-id=220 bgcolor=#d6d6d6
| 503220 ||  || — || January 28, 2015 || Haleakala || Pan-STARRS || TIR || align=right | 3.1 km || 
|-id=221 bgcolor=#d6d6d6
| 503221 ||  || — || June 11, 2010 || Mount Lemmon || Mount Lemmon Survey ||  || align=right | 2.8 km || 
|-id=222 bgcolor=#d6d6d6
| 503222 ||  || — || October 16, 2006 || Catalina || CSS ||  || align=right | 3.9 km || 
|-id=223 bgcolor=#d6d6d6
| 503223 ||  || — || February 3, 1997 || Kitt Peak || Spacewatch || THM || align=right | 2.3 km || 
|-id=224 bgcolor=#d6d6d6
| 503224 ||  || — || April 26, 2004 || Anderson Mesa || LONEOS ||  || align=right | 2.8 km || 
|-id=225 bgcolor=#d6d6d6
| 503225 ||  || — || August 21, 2006 || Kitt Peak || Spacewatch || EOS || align=right | 2.8 km || 
|-id=226 bgcolor=#d6d6d6
| 503226 ||  || — || January 17, 2009 || Mount Lemmon || Mount Lemmon Survey ||  || align=right | 2.1 km || 
|-id=227 bgcolor=#d6d6d6
| 503227 ||  || — || March 4, 2006 || Kitt Peak || Spacewatch || 3:2 || align=right | 4.0 km || 
|-id=228 bgcolor=#E9E9E9
| 503228 ||  || — || October 23, 2004 || Kitt Peak || Spacewatch ||  || align=right | 1.7 km || 
|-id=229 bgcolor=#d6d6d6
| 503229 ||  || — || April 1, 2015 || Haleakala || Pan-STARRS ||  || align=right | 2.7 km || 
|-id=230 bgcolor=#d6d6d6
| 503230 ||  || — || November 18, 2000 || Anderson Mesa || LONEOS || EUP || align=right | 4.6 km || 
|-id=231 bgcolor=#d6d6d6
| 503231 ||  || — || November 13, 2007 || Kitt Peak || Spacewatch ||  || align=right | 2.8 km || 
|-id=232 bgcolor=#E9E9E9
| 503232 ||  || — || February 14, 2010 || Kitt Peak || Spacewatch || CLO || align=right | 1.8 km || 
|-id=233 bgcolor=#d6d6d6
| 503233 ||  || — || January 28, 2015 || Haleakala || Pan-STARRS ||  || align=right | 2.4 km || 
|-id=234 bgcolor=#d6d6d6
| 503234 ||  || — || October 30, 2002 || Kitt Peak || Spacewatch || 3:2 || align=right | 5.1 km || 
|-id=235 bgcolor=#d6d6d6
| 503235 ||  || — || February 8, 2014 || Mount Lemmon || Mount Lemmon Survey ||  || align=right | 2.4 km || 
|-id=236 bgcolor=#d6d6d6
| 503236 ||  || — || September 4, 2011 || Haleakala || Pan-STARRS ||  || align=right | 4.0 km || 
|-id=237 bgcolor=#d6d6d6
| 503237 ||  || — || January 31, 2003 || Kitt Peak || Spacewatch || HYG || align=right | 3.4 km || 
|-id=238 bgcolor=#d6d6d6
| 503238 ||  || — || September 19, 2012 || Mount Lemmon || Mount Lemmon Survey ||  || align=right | 2.6 km || 
|-id=239 bgcolor=#d6d6d6
| 503239 ||  || — || October 4, 2006 || Mount Lemmon || Mount Lemmon Survey || URS || align=right | 3.9 km || 
|-id=240 bgcolor=#E9E9E9
| 503240 ||  || — || October 29, 2005 || Catalina || CSS || (5) || align=right data-sort-value="0.79" | 790 m || 
|-id=241 bgcolor=#d6d6d6
| 503241 ||  || — || August 24, 2011 || Haleakala || Pan-STARRS || EOS || align=right | 2.4 km || 
|-id=242 bgcolor=#E9E9E9
| 503242 ||  || — || May 23, 2011 || Mount Lemmon || Mount Lemmon Survey || EUN || align=right | 1.6 km || 
|-id=243 bgcolor=#d6d6d6
| 503243 ||  || — || November 12, 2007 || Mount Lemmon || Mount Lemmon Survey ||  || align=right | 4.0 km || 
|-id=244 bgcolor=#d6d6d6
| 503244 ||  || — || September 29, 2011 || Mount Lemmon || Mount Lemmon Survey ||  || align=right | 3.4 km || 
|-id=245 bgcolor=#d6d6d6
| 503245 ||  || — || December 26, 1998 || Caussols || ODAS ||  || align=right | 3.5 km || 
|-id=246 bgcolor=#d6d6d6
| 503246 ||  || — || October 28, 2011 || Mount Lemmon || Mount Lemmon Survey ||  || align=right | 3.7 km || 
|-id=247 bgcolor=#d6d6d6
| 503247 ||  || — || April 22, 2009 || Mount Lemmon || Mount Lemmon Survey ||  || align=right | 3.7 km || 
|-id=248 bgcolor=#d6d6d6
| 503248 ||  || — || January 18, 2008 || Mount Lemmon || Mount Lemmon Survey ||  || align=right | 2.7 km || 
|-id=249 bgcolor=#d6d6d6
| 503249 ||  || — || April 19, 2015 || Kitt Peak || Spacewatch ||  || align=right | 2.5 km || 
|-id=250 bgcolor=#d6d6d6
| 503250 ||  || — || February 26, 2014 || Haleakala || Pan-STARRS ||  || align=right | 2.9 km || 
|-id=251 bgcolor=#d6d6d6
| 503251 ||  || — || December 7, 2012 || Haleakala || Pan-STARRS ||  || align=right | 3.2 km || 
|-id=252 bgcolor=#d6d6d6
| 503252 ||  || — || February 24, 2014 || Haleakala || Pan-STARRS || TIR || align=right | 2.6 km || 
|-id=253 bgcolor=#d6d6d6
| 503253 ||  || — || April 23, 2015 || Haleakala || Pan-STARRS || 3:2 || align=right | 4.2 km || 
|-id=254 bgcolor=#fefefe
| 503254 ||  || — || March 16, 2007 || Kitt Peak || Spacewatch ||  || align=right data-sort-value="0.82" | 820 m || 
|-id=255 bgcolor=#d6d6d6
| 503255 ||  || — || September 1, 2011 || Siding Spring || SSS ||  || align=right | 4.3 km || 
|-id=256 bgcolor=#d6d6d6
| 503256 ||  || — || February 27, 2015 || Haleakala || Pan-STARRS || EOS || align=right | 2.7 km || 
|-id=257 bgcolor=#d6d6d6
| 503257 ||  || — || March 12, 2008 || Kitt Peak || Spacewatch || 7:4 || align=right | 3.4 km || 
|-id=258 bgcolor=#E9E9E9
| 503258 ||  || — || September 4, 2008 || Kitt Peak || Spacewatch ||  || align=right | 1.6 km || 
|-id=259 bgcolor=#d6d6d6
| 503259 ||  || — || December 9, 2012 || Haleakala || Pan-STARRS ||  || align=right | 2.8 km || 
|-id=260 bgcolor=#d6d6d6
| 503260 ||  || — || September 4, 2011 || Haleakala || Pan-STARRS ||  || align=right | 2.5 km || 
|-id=261 bgcolor=#d6d6d6
| 503261 ||  || — || December 18, 2007 || Mount Lemmon || Mount Lemmon Survey || EOS || align=right | 2.6 km || 
|-id=262 bgcolor=#C2FFFF
| 503262 ||  || — || February 10, 2014 || Haleakala || Pan-STARRS || L4 || align=right | 7.4 km || 
|-id=263 bgcolor=#d6d6d6
| 503263 ||  || — || November 7, 2012 || Mount Lemmon || Mount Lemmon Survey || EOS || align=right | 3.3 km || 
|-id=264 bgcolor=#E9E9E9
| 503264 ||  || — || October 8, 2008 || Mount Lemmon || Mount Lemmon Survey || 526 || align=right | 2.1 km || 
|-id=265 bgcolor=#d6d6d6
| 503265 ||  || — || June 10, 2010 || WISE || WISE || 7:4 || align=right | 5.9 km || 
|-id=266 bgcolor=#d6d6d6
| 503266 ||  || — || January 26, 2014 || Haleakala || Pan-STARRS ||  || align=right | 3.1 km || 
|-id=267 bgcolor=#d6d6d6
| 503267 ||  || — || March 29, 2014 || Haleakala || Pan-STARRS ||  || align=right | 3.2 km || 
|-id=268 bgcolor=#fefefe
| 503268 ||  || — || December 4, 2013 || Haleakala || Pan-STARRS || H || align=right data-sort-value="0.71" | 710 m || 
|-id=269 bgcolor=#d6d6d6
| 503269 ||  || — || June 18, 2010 || WISE || WISE ||  || align=right | 2.5 km || 
|-id=270 bgcolor=#d6d6d6
| 503270 ||  || — || October 28, 2005 || Mount Lemmon || Mount Lemmon Survey ||  || align=right | 3.4 km || 
|-id=271 bgcolor=#d6d6d6
| 503271 ||  || — || November 1, 2006 || Mount Lemmon || Mount Lemmon Survey ||  || align=right | 3.2 km || 
|-id=272 bgcolor=#d6d6d6
| 503272 ||  || — || May 21, 2014 || Haleakala || Pan-STARRS ||  || align=right | 3.5 km || 
|-id=273 bgcolor=#C7FF8F
| 503273 ||  || — || July 25, 2014 || Haleakala || Pan-STARRS || centaur || align=right | 19 km || 
|-id=274 bgcolor=#FFC2E0
| 503274 ||  || — || August 24, 2011 || Haleakala || Pan-STARRS || AMO || align=right data-sort-value="0.46" | 460 m || 
|-id=275 bgcolor=#fefefe
| 503275 ||  || — || January 24, 2014 || Haleakala || Pan-STARRS || H || align=right data-sort-value="0.64" | 640 m || 
|-id=276 bgcolor=#fefefe
| 503276 ||  || — || February 20, 2014 || Haleakala || Pan-STARRS || H || align=right data-sort-value="0.59" | 590 m || 
|-id=277 bgcolor=#FFC2E0
| 503277 ||  || — || September 15, 2015 || Mayhill-ISON || ISON || AMOcritical || align=right data-sort-value="0.39" | 390 m || 
|-id=278 bgcolor=#d6d6d6
| 503278 ||  || — || October 12, 2010 || Mount Lemmon || Mount Lemmon Survey ||  || align=right | 2.7 km || 
|-id=279 bgcolor=#fefefe
| 503279 ||  || — || June 1, 2009 || Catalina || CSS || H || align=right data-sort-value="0.71" | 710 m || 
|-id=280 bgcolor=#d6d6d6
| 503280 ||  || — || July 1, 2014 || Haleakala || Pan-STARRS ||  || align=right | 3.0 km || 
|-id=281 bgcolor=#fefefe
| 503281 ||  || — || December 5, 2008 || Kitt Peak || Spacewatch ||  || align=right | 1.0 km || 
|-id=282 bgcolor=#E9E9E9
| 503282 ||  || — || January 17, 2013 || Mount Lemmon || Mount Lemmon Survey ||  || align=right | 1.4 km || 
|-id=283 bgcolor=#E9E9E9
| 503283 ||  || — || February 28, 2008 || Mount Lemmon || Mount Lemmon Survey || AGN || align=right | 2.3 km || 
|-id=284 bgcolor=#d6d6d6
| 503284 ||  || — || June 28, 2014 || Haleakala || Pan-STARRS ||  || align=right | 2.9 km || 
|-id=285 bgcolor=#d6d6d6
| 503285 ||  || — || June 25, 2014 || Mount Lemmon || Mount Lemmon Survey ||  || align=right | 2.8 km || 
|-id=286 bgcolor=#FA8072
| 503286 ||  || — || October 4, 2002 || Socorro || LINEAR || H || align=right data-sort-value="0.64" | 640 m || 
|-id=287 bgcolor=#d6d6d6
| 503287 ||  || — || March 10, 2000 || Socorro || LINEAR || Tj (2.98) || align=right | 2.9 km || 
|-id=288 bgcolor=#fefefe
| 503288 ||  || — || January 9, 2011 || Mount Lemmon || Mount Lemmon Survey || H || align=right data-sort-value="0.61" | 610 m || 
|-id=289 bgcolor=#fefefe
| 503289 ||  || — || January 17, 2009 || Kitt Peak || Spacewatch || NYS || align=right data-sort-value="0.52" | 520 m || 
|-id=290 bgcolor=#fefefe
| 503290 ||  || — || July 12, 1999 || Socorro || LINEAR || H || align=right data-sort-value="0.77" | 770 m || 
|-id=291 bgcolor=#fefefe
| 503291 ||  || — || January 4, 2011 || Mount Lemmon || Mount Lemmon Survey || H || align=right data-sort-value="0.48" | 480 m || 
|-id=292 bgcolor=#fefefe
| 503292 ||  || — || October 5, 2012 || Haleakala || Pan-STARRS || H || align=right data-sort-value="0.89" | 890 m || 
|-id=293 bgcolor=#FFC2E0
| 503293 ||  || — || November 21, 2006 || Catalina || CSS || AMOcritical || align=right data-sort-value="0.51" | 510 m || 
|-id=294 bgcolor=#fefefe
| 503294 ||  || — || January 3, 2009 || Mount Lemmon || Mount Lemmon Survey || NYS || align=right data-sort-value="0.68" | 680 m || 
|-id=295 bgcolor=#E9E9E9
| 503295 ||  || — || April 15, 2008 || Kitt Peak || Spacewatch ||  || align=right | 1.5 km || 
|-id=296 bgcolor=#E9E9E9
| 503296 ||  || — || July 11, 2004 || Socorro || LINEAR ||  || align=right | 2.1 km || 
|-id=297 bgcolor=#E9E9E9
| 503297 ||  || — || January 14, 2008 || Kitt Peak || Spacewatch ||  || align=right | 1.2 km || 
|-id=298 bgcolor=#fefefe
| 503298 ||  || — || February 9, 2013 || Haleakala || Pan-STARRS ||  || align=right data-sort-value="0.76" | 760 m || 
|-id=299 bgcolor=#FA8072
| 503299 ||  || — || September 4, 2012 || Haleakala || Pan-STARRS || H || align=right data-sort-value="0.59" | 590 m || 
|-id=300 bgcolor=#fefefe
| 503300 ||  || — || January 4, 2016 || Haleakala || Pan-STARRS ||  || align=right data-sort-value="0.74" | 740 m || 
|}

503301–503400 

|-bgcolor=#fefefe
| 503301 ||  || — || May 6, 2002 || Kitt Peak || Spacewatch ||  || align=right data-sort-value="0.74" | 740 m || 
|-id=302 bgcolor=#fefefe
| 503302 ||  || — || February 22, 2009 || Kitt Peak || Spacewatch ||  || align=right data-sort-value="0.69" | 690 m || 
|-id=303 bgcolor=#E9E9E9
| 503303 ||  || — || July 13, 2013 || Haleakala || Pan-STARRS ||  || align=right data-sort-value="0.94" | 940 m || 
|-id=304 bgcolor=#fefefe
| 503304 ||  || — || April 19, 1998 || Kitt Peak || Spacewatch ||  || align=right data-sort-value="0.64" | 640 m || 
|-id=305 bgcolor=#fefefe
| 503305 ||  || — || February 8, 2011 || Catalina || CSS || H || align=right data-sort-value="0.71" | 710 m || 
|-id=306 bgcolor=#d6d6d6
| 503306 ||  || — || November 23, 2014 || Haleakala || Pan-STARRS ||  || align=right | 3.1 km || 
|-id=307 bgcolor=#E9E9E9
| 503307 ||  || — || September 4, 2014 || Haleakala || Pan-STARRS || GEF || align=right | 1.3 km || 
|-id=308 bgcolor=#fefefe
| 503308 ||  || — || March 19, 2009 || Catalina || CSS ||  || align=right data-sort-value="0.76" | 760 m || 
|-id=309 bgcolor=#fefefe
| 503309 ||  || — || June 26, 2006 || Siding Spring || SSS ||  || align=right | 1.0 km || 
|-id=310 bgcolor=#E9E9E9
| 503310 ||  || — || February 1, 2012 || Mount Lemmon || Mount Lemmon Survey || EUN || align=right | 1.2 km || 
|-id=311 bgcolor=#fefefe
| 503311 ||  || — || January 16, 2005 || Kitt Peak || Spacewatch || NYS || align=right data-sort-value="0.74" | 740 m || 
|-id=312 bgcolor=#fefefe
| 503312 ||  || — || March 3, 2005 || Catalina || CSS ||  || align=right data-sort-value="0.83" | 830 m || 
|-id=313 bgcolor=#fefefe
| 503313 ||  || — || December 16, 2004 || Catalina || CSS ||  || align=right | 1.2 km || 
|-id=314 bgcolor=#d6d6d6
| 503314 ||  || — || January 15, 2010 || Mount Lemmon || Mount Lemmon Survey ||  || align=right | 3.1 km || 
|-id=315 bgcolor=#FA8072
| 503315 ||  || — || March 30, 2011 || Mount Lemmon || Mount Lemmon Survey || H || align=right data-sort-value="0.55" | 550 m || 
|-id=316 bgcolor=#d6d6d6
| 503316 ||  || — || January 28, 2004 || Kitt Peak || Spacewatch ||  || align=right | 3.4 km || 
|-id=317 bgcolor=#fefefe
| 503317 ||  || — || August 15, 2009 || Catalina || CSS || H || align=right data-sort-value="0.71" | 710 m || 
|-id=318 bgcolor=#fefefe
| 503318 ||  || — || November 4, 2012 || Haleakala || Pan-STARRS || H || align=right data-sort-value="0.79" | 790 m || 
|-id=319 bgcolor=#E9E9E9
| 503319 ||  || — || July 13, 2013 || Mount Lemmon || Mount Lemmon Survey ||  || align=right | 2.0 km || 
|-id=320 bgcolor=#d6d6d6
| 503320 ||  || — || October 16, 2014 || Mount Lemmon || Mount Lemmon Survey || BRA || align=right | 1.5 km || 
|-id=321 bgcolor=#fefefe
| 503321 ||  || — || October 4, 2012 || Haleakala || Pan-STARRS || H || align=right data-sort-value="0.59" | 590 m || 
|-id=322 bgcolor=#E9E9E9
| 503322 ||  || — || January 11, 2016 || Haleakala || Pan-STARRS || ADE || align=right | 1.4 km || 
|-id=323 bgcolor=#d6d6d6
| 503323 ||  || — || April 2, 2011 || Mount Lemmon || Mount Lemmon Survey || EOS || align=right | 1.4 km || 
|-id=324 bgcolor=#fefefe
| 503324 ||  || — || December 18, 2004 || Mount Lemmon || Mount Lemmon Survey ||  || align=right | 1.1 km || 
|-id=325 bgcolor=#fefefe
| 503325 ||  || — || November 12, 2007 || Catalina || CSS || H || align=right data-sort-value="0.70" | 700 m || 
|-id=326 bgcolor=#fefefe
| 503326 ||  || — || April 26, 2006 || Siding Spring || SSS ||  || align=right | 1.1 km || 
|-id=327 bgcolor=#E9E9E9
| 503327 ||  || — || November 18, 2014 || Kitt Peak || Spacewatch ||  || align=right | 1.5 km || 
|-id=328 bgcolor=#E9E9E9
| 503328 ||  || — || January 17, 2007 || Kitt Peak || Spacewatch || EUN || align=right | 1.7 km || 
|-id=329 bgcolor=#fefefe
| 503329 ||  || — || January 2, 2012 || Mount Lemmon || Mount Lemmon Survey ||  || align=right data-sort-value="0.71" | 710 m || 
|-id=330 bgcolor=#E9E9E9
| 503330 ||  || — || April 27, 2012 || Haleakala || Pan-STARRS ||  || align=right | 1.5 km || 
|-id=331 bgcolor=#E9E9E9
| 503331 ||  || — || July 15, 2013 || Haleakala || Pan-STARRS ||  || align=right data-sort-value="0.90" | 900 m || 
|-id=332 bgcolor=#FA8072
| 503332 ||  || — || December 9, 2010 || Mount Lemmon || Mount Lemmon Survey || H || align=right data-sort-value="0.55" | 550 m || 
|-id=333 bgcolor=#fefefe
| 503333 ||  || — || December 10, 2005 || Kitt Peak || Spacewatch ||  || align=right data-sort-value="0.64" | 640 m || 
|-id=334 bgcolor=#fefefe
| 503334 ||  || — || December 25, 2005 || Kitt Peak || Spacewatch ||  || align=right data-sort-value="0.59" | 590 m || 
|-id=335 bgcolor=#fefefe
| 503335 ||  || — || December 28, 2005 || Kitt Peak || Spacewatch ||  || align=right data-sort-value="0.53" | 530 m || 
|-id=336 bgcolor=#fefefe
| 503336 ||  || — || January 30, 2011 || Haleakala || Pan-STARRS || H || align=right data-sort-value="0.50" | 500 m || 
|-id=337 bgcolor=#fefefe
| 503337 ||  || — || November 8, 2007 || Kitt Peak || Spacewatch ||  || align=right data-sort-value="0.78" | 780 m || 
|-id=338 bgcolor=#fefefe
| 503338 ||  || — || October 19, 2011 || Kitt Peak || Spacewatch ||  || align=right data-sort-value="0.73" | 730 m || 
|-id=339 bgcolor=#fefefe
| 503339 ||  || — || March 16, 2009 || Kitt Peak || Spacewatch || NYS || align=right data-sort-value="0.65" | 650 m || 
|-id=340 bgcolor=#fefefe
| 503340 ||  || — || April 12, 2005 || Kitt Peak || Spacewatch || NYS || align=right data-sort-value="0.82" | 820 m || 
|-id=341 bgcolor=#fefefe
| 503341 ||  || — || October 17, 2012 || Haleakala || Pan-STARRS || H || align=right data-sort-value="0.84" | 840 m || 
|-id=342 bgcolor=#fefefe
| 503342 ||  || — || January 30, 2011 || Haleakala || Pan-STARRS || H || align=right data-sort-value="0.57" | 570 m || 
|-id=343 bgcolor=#E9E9E9
| 503343 ||  || — || January 10, 2008 || Mount Lemmon || Mount Lemmon Survey ||  || align=right data-sort-value="0.85" | 850 m || 
|-id=344 bgcolor=#fefefe
| 503344 ||  || — || November 18, 2007 || Mount Lemmon || Mount Lemmon Survey || MAS || align=right data-sort-value="0.77" | 770 m || 
|-id=345 bgcolor=#d6d6d6
| 503345 ||  || — || June 1, 2012 || Mount Lemmon || Mount Lemmon Survey || EOS || align=right | 2.4 km || 
|-id=346 bgcolor=#fefefe
| 503346 ||  || — || April 2, 2009 || Mount Lemmon || Mount Lemmon Survey ||  || align=right data-sort-value="0.72" | 720 m || 
|-id=347 bgcolor=#fefefe
| 503347 ||  || — || December 30, 2008 || Mount Lemmon || Mount Lemmon Survey ||  || align=right data-sort-value="0.76" | 760 m || 
|-id=348 bgcolor=#fefefe
| 503348 ||  || — || March 18, 2007 || Kitt Peak || Spacewatch ||  || align=right data-sort-value="0.66" | 660 m || 
|-id=349 bgcolor=#fefefe
| 503349 ||  || — || January 26, 2012 || Mount Lemmon || Mount Lemmon Survey ||  || align=right data-sort-value="0.87" | 870 m || 
|-id=350 bgcolor=#d6d6d6
| 503350 ||  || — || January 26, 2006 || Kitt Peak || Spacewatch ||  || align=right | 2.4 km || 
|-id=351 bgcolor=#fefefe
| 503351 ||  || — || March 13, 2013 || Mount Lemmon || Mount Lemmon Survey ||  || align=right data-sort-value="0.52" | 520 m || 
|-id=352 bgcolor=#fefefe
| 503352 ||  || — || April 6, 2013 || Mount Lemmon || Mount Lemmon Survey ||  || align=right data-sort-value="0.61" | 610 m || 
|-id=353 bgcolor=#E9E9E9
| 503353 ||  || — || February 26, 2012 || Kitt Peak || Spacewatch ||  || align=right | 1.2 km || 
|-id=354 bgcolor=#d6d6d6
| 503354 ||  || — || March 24, 2006 || Kitt Peak || Spacewatch ||  || align=right | 2.4 km || 
|-id=355 bgcolor=#fefefe
| 503355 ||  || — || April 15, 2013 || Haleakala || Pan-STARRS ||  || align=right data-sort-value="0.65" | 650 m || 
|-id=356 bgcolor=#fefefe
| 503356 ||  || — || October 11, 2007 || Mount Lemmon || Mount Lemmon Survey ||  || align=right data-sort-value="0.52" | 520 m || 
|-id=357 bgcolor=#fefefe
| 503357 ||  || — || August 25, 2014 || Haleakala || Pan-STARRS ||  || align=right data-sort-value="0.65" | 650 m || 
|-id=358 bgcolor=#fefefe
| 503358 ||  || — || March 16, 2013 || Mount Lemmon || Mount Lemmon Survey ||  || align=right data-sort-value="0.52" | 520 m || 
|-id=359 bgcolor=#fefefe
| 503359 ||  || — || October 25, 2011 || Haleakala || Pan-STARRS ||  || align=right data-sort-value="0.82" | 820 m || 
|-id=360 bgcolor=#fefefe
| 503360 ||  || — || November 17, 2011 || Mount Lemmon || Mount Lemmon Survey ||  || align=right data-sort-value="0.75" | 750 m || 
|-id=361 bgcolor=#fefefe
| 503361 ||  || — || April 2, 2005 || Mount Lemmon || Mount Lemmon Survey || MAS || align=right data-sort-value="0.69" | 690 m || 
|-id=362 bgcolor=#E9E9E9
| 503362 ||  || — || November 12, 2010 || Kitt Peak || Spacewatch ||  || align=right | 1.5 km || 
|-id=363 bgcolor=#fefefe
| 503363 ||  || — || March 11, 2005 || Mount Lemmon || Mount Lemmon Survey || NYS || align=right data-sort-value="0.91" | 910 m || 
|-id=364 bgcolor=#fefefe
| 503364 ||  || — || December 20, 2004 || Mount Lemmon || Mount Lemmon Survey || NYS || align=right data-sort-value="0.68" | 680 m || 
|-id=365 bgcolor=#fefefe
| 503365 ||  || — || July 27, 2014 || Haleakala || Pan-STARRS ||  || align=right data-sort-value="0.76" | 760 m || 
|-id=366 bgcolor=#fefefe
| 503366 ||  || — || May 26, 2006 || Mount Lemmon || Mount Lemmon Survey || NYS || align=right data-sort-value="0.79" | 790 m || 
|-id=367 bgcolor=#E9E9E9
| 503367 ||  || — || February 12, 2008 || Mount Lemmon || Mount Lemmon Survey ||  || align=right data-sort-value="0.86" | 860 m || 
|-id=368 bgcolor=#fefefe
| 503368 ||  || — || June 12, 2013 || Haleakala || Pan-STARRS ||  || align=right data-sort-value="0.65" | 650 m || 
|-id=369 bgcolor=#FA8072
| 503369 ||  || — || February 10, 2002 || Socorro || LINEAR ||  || align=right | 1.1 km || 
|-id=370 bgcolor=#fefefe
| 503370 ||  || — || April 2, 2013 || Catalina || CSS ||  || align=right data-sort-value="0.74" | 740 m || 
|-id=371 bgcolor=#d6d6d6
| 503371 ||  || — || January 7, 2010 || Kitt Peak || Spacewatch ||  || align=right | 3.0 km || 
|-id=372 bgcolor=#FA8072
| 503372 ||  || — || January 27, 2011 || Kitt Peak || Spacewatch || H || align=right data-sort-value="0.40" | 400 m || 
|-id=373 bgcolor=#fefefe
| 503373 ||  || — || December 22, 2012 || Haleakala || Pan-STARRS || H || align=right data-sort-value="0.66" | 660 m || 
|-id=374 bgcolor=#fefefe
| 503374 ||  || — || November 5, 2007 || Kitt Peak || Spacewatch ||  || align=right data-sort-value="0.78" | 780 m || 
|-id=375 bgcolor=#E9E9E9
| 503375 ||  || — || April 15, 2007 || Catalina || CSS ||  || align=right | 1.9 km || 
|-id=376 bgcolor=#fefefe
| 503376 ||  || — || January 18, 2009 || Mount Lemmon || Mount Lemmon Survey ||  || align=right | 1.0 km || 
|-id=377 bgcolor=#fefefe
| 503377 ||  || — || February 20, 2006 || Kitt Peak || Spacewatch ||  || align=right data-sort-value="0.67" | 670 m || 
|-id=378 bgcolor=#E9E9E9
| 503378 ||  || — || March 4, 2008 || Mount Lemmon || Mount Lemmon Survey ||  || align=right | 1.0 km || 
|-id=379 bgcolor=#d6d6d6
| 503379 ||  || — || November 18, 2003 || Kitt Peak || Spacewatch || EOS || align=right | 3.3 km || 
|-id=380 bgcolor=#d6d6d6
| 503380 ||  || — || November 26, 2014 || Haleakala || Pan-STARRS ||  || align=right | 3.1 km || 
|-id=381 bgcolor=#fefefe
| 503381 ||  || — || April 9, 2002 || Socorro || LINEAR || NYS || align=right data-sort-value="0.77" | 770 m || 
|-id=382 bgcolor=#fefefe
| 503382 ||  || — || May 15, 2013 || Haleakala || Pan-STARRS ||  || align=right data-sort-value="0.69" | 690 m || 
|-id=383 bgcolor=#E9E9E9
| 503383 ||  || — || November 26, 2005 || Kitt Peak || Spacewatch || GEF || align=right | 2.4 km || 
|-id=384 bgcolor=#fefefe
| 503384 ||  || — || September 9, 2007 || Kitt Peak || Spacewatch ||  || align=right data-sort-value="0.89" | 890 m || 
|-id=385 bgcolor=#fefefe
| 503385 ||  || — || October 14, 2014 || Mount Lemmon || Mount Lemmon Survey ||  || align=right data-sort-value="0.74" | 740 m || 
|-id=386 bgcolor=#E9E9E9
| 503386 ||  || — || February 24, 2012 || Haleakala || Pan-STARRS ||  || align=right data-sort-value="0.89" | 890 m || 
|-id=387 bgcolor=#fefefe
| 503387 ||  || — || October 18, 2007 || Mount Lemmon || Mount Lemmon Survey || (2076) || align=right data-sort-value="0.62" | 620 m || 
|-id=388 bgcolor=#E9E9E9
| 503388 ||  || — || March 11, 2008 || Kitt Peak || Spacewatch ||  || align=right data-sort-value="0.81" | 810 m || 
|-id=389 bgcolor=#fefefe
| 503389 ||  || — || January 8, 2006 || Mount Lemmon || Mount Lemmon Survey ||  || align=right data-sort-value="0.97" | 970 m || 
|-id=390 bgcolor=#fefefe
| 503390 ||  || — || April 8, 2013 || Mount Lemmon || Mount Lemmon Survey ||  || align=right data-sort-value="0.57" | 570 m || 
|-id=391 bgcolor=#fefefe
| 503391 ||  || — || February 28, 2006 || Mount Lemmon || Mount Lemmon Survey ||  || align=right data-sort-value="0.65" | 650 m || 
|-id=392 bgcolor=#fefefe
| 503392 ||  || — || April 9, 2010 || Kitt Peak || Spacewatch ||  || align=right data-sort-value="0.72" | 720 m || 
|-id=393 bgcolor=#fefefe
| 503393 ||  || — || January 27, 2012 || Mount Lemmon || Mount Lemmon Survey ||  || align=right data-sort-value="0.75" | 750 m || 
|-id=394 bgcolor=#d6d6d6
| 503394 ||  || — || October 10, 2008 || Kitt Peak || Spacewatch ||  || align=right | 2.5 km || 
|-id=395 bgcolor=#E9E9E9
| 503395 ||  || — || May 5, 2008 || Catalina || CSS ||  || align=right | 1.4 km || 
|-id=396 bgcolor=#fefefe
| 503396 ||  || — || February 20, 2006 || Kitt Peak || Spacewatch ||  || align=right data-sort-value="0.80" | 800 m || 
|-id=397 bgcolor=#fefefe
| 503397 ||  || — || August 21, 2006 || Kitt Peak || Spacewatch ||  || align=right data-sort-value="0.84" | 840 m || 
|-id=398 bgcolor=#fefefe
| 503398 ||  || — || January 3, 2012 || Kitt Peak || Spacewatch || SUL || align=right data-sort-value="0.84" | 840 m || 
|-id=399 bgcolor=#fefefe
| 503399 ||  || — || January 19, 2005 || Kitt Peak || Spacewatch || NYS || align=right data-sort-value="0.51" | 510 m || 
|-id=400 bgcolor=#E9E9E9
| 503400 ||  || — || February 26, 2012 || Kitt Peak || Spacewatch ||  || align=right | 1.2 km || 
|}

503401–503500 

|-bgcolor=#fefefe
| 503401 ||  || — || February 26, 2009 || Kitt Peak || Spacewatch || NYS || align=right data-sort-value="0.59" | 590 m || 
|-id=402 bgcolor=#E9E9E9
| 503402 ||  || — || February 13, 2004 || Kitt Peak || Spacewatch ||  || align=right data-sort-value="0.95" | 950 m || 
|-id=403 bgcolor=#d6d6d6
| 503403 ||  || — || April 8, 2010 || WISE || WISE ||  || align=right | 5.0 km || 
|-id=404 bgcolor=#d6d6d6
| 503404 ||  || — || September 15, 2006 || Kitt Peak || Spacewatch || TIR || align=right | 2.4 km || 
|-id=405 bgcolor=#fefefe
| 503405 ||  || — || September 19, 2009 || Catalina || CSS || H || align=right data-sort-value="0.57" | 570 m || 
|-id=406 bgcolor=#fefefe
| 503406 ||  || — || April 10, 2005 || Mount Lemmon || Mount Lemmon Survey ||  || align=right data-sort-value="0.72" | 720 m || 
|-id=407 bgcolor=#E9E9E9
| 503407 ||  || — || December 21, 2006 || Kitt Peak || Spacewatch || HNS || align=right | 1.5 km || 
|-id=408 bgcolor=#E9E9E9
| 503408 ||  || — || January 28, 2007 || Kitt Peak || Spacewatch || MAR || align=right | 1.3 km || 
|-id=409 bgcolor=#d6d6d6
| 503409 ||  || — || March 4, 2005 || Catalina || CSS ||  || align=right | 3.5 km || 
|-id=410 bgcolor=#E9E9E9
| 503410 ||  || — || October 3, 2013 || Kitt Peak || Spacewatch ||  || align=right | 1.4 km || 
|-id=411 bgcolor=#E9E9E9
| 503411 ||  || — || May 5, 2003 || Kitt Peak || Spacewatch ||  || align=right | 1.4 km || 
|-id=412 bgcolor=#fefefe
| 503412 ||  || — || February 25, 2011 || Kitt Peak || Spacewatch || H || align=right data-sort-value="0.66" | 660 m || 
|-id=413 bgcolor=#fefefe
| 503413 ||  || — || July 1, 2014 || Haleakala || Pan-STARRS || H || align=right data-sort-value="0.64" | 640 m || 
|-id=414 bgcolor=#fefefe
| 503414 ||  || — || January 20, 2008 || Mount Lemmon || Mount Lemmon Survey || H || align=right data-sort-value="0.62" | 620 m || 
|-id=415 bgcolor=#fefefe
| 503415 ||  || — || December 10, 2004 || Socorro || LINEAR || H || align=right data-sort-value="0.55" | 550 m || 
|-id=416 bgcolor=#fefefe
| 503416 ||  || — || January 12, 2002 || Campo Imperatore || CINEOS ||  || align=right data-sort-value="0.61" | 610 m || 
|-id=417 bgcolor=#fefefe
| 503417 ||  || — || March 11, 2005 || Kitt Peak || Spacewatch ||  || align=right | 2.6 km || 
|-id=418 bgcolor=#d6d6d6
| 503418 ||  || — || December 12, 2014 || Haleakala || Pan-STARRS ||  || align=right | 2.9 km || 
|-id=419 bgcolor=#fefefe
| 503419 ||  || — || January 15, 2008 || Kitt Peak || Spacewatch || NYS || align=right data-sort-value="0.77" | 770 m || 
|-id=420 bgcolor=#fefefe
| 503420 ||  || — || October 24, 2011 || Mount Lemmon || Mount Lemmon Survey ||  || align=right data-sort-value="0.47" | 470 m || 
|-id=421 bgcolor=#fefefe
| 503421 ||  || — || March 28, 2009 || Kitt Peak || Spacewatch ||  || align=right data-sort-value="0.96" | 960 m || 
|-id=422 bgcolor=#E9E9E9
| 503422 ||  || — || January 30, 2011 || Haleakala || Pan-STARRS ||  || align=right | 2.4 km || 
|-id=423 bgcolor=#fefefe
| 503423 ||  || — || February 8, 2008 || Mount Lemmon || Mount Lemmon Survey || H || align=right data-sort-value="0.63" | 630 m || 
|-id=424 bgcolor=#fefefe
| 503424 ||  || — || February 8, 2008 || Mount Lemmon || Mount Lemmon Survey || NYS || align=right data-sort-value="0.73" | 730 m || 
|-id=425 bgcolor=#fefefe
| 503425 ||  || — || October 26, 2011 || Haleakala || Pan-STARRS ||  || align=right data-sort-value="0.80" | 800 m || 
|-id=426 bgcolor=#E9E9E9
| 503426 ||  || — || May 20, 2013 || Haleakala || Pan-STARRS ||  || align=right | 1.3 km || 
|-id=427 bgcolor=#d6d6d6
| 503427 ||  || — || January 18, 2015 || Mount Lemmon || Mount Lemmon Survey ||  || align=right | 2.7 km || 
|-id=428 bgcolor=#E9E9E9
| 503428 ||  || — || January 13, 2015 || Haleakala || Pan-STARRS ||  || align=right | 2.7 km || 
|-id=429 bgcolor=#d6d6d6
| 503429 ||  || — || March 25, 2011 || Haleakala || Pan-STARRS ||  || align=right | 2.8 km || 
|-id=430 bgcolor=#E9E9E9
| 503430 ||  || — || December 7, 1996 || Kitt Peak || Spacewatch || MAR || align=right | 2.6 km || 
|-id=431 bgcolor=#d6d6d6
| 503431 ||  || — || January 12, 2010 || Kitt Peak || Spacewatch ||  || align=right | 3.5 km || 
|-id=432 bgcolor=#fefefe
| 503432 ||  || — || September 1, 2010 || Mount Lemmon || Mount Lemmon Survey ||  || align=right data-sort-value="0.57" | 570 m || 
|-id=433 bgcolor=#fefefe
| 503433 ||  || — || September 7, 2004 || Socorro || LINEAR || H || align=right data-sort-value="0.66" | 660 m || 
|-id=434 bgcolor=#FA8072
| 503434 ||  || — || February 7, 2011 || Catalina || CSS ||  || align=right data-sort-value="0.45" | 450 m || 
|-id=435 bgcolor=#d6d6d6
| 503435 ||  || — || August 13, 2012 || Haleakala || Pan-STARRS ||  || align=right | 2.9 km || 
|-id=436 bgcolor=#fefefe
| 503436 ||  || — || December 27, 2005 || Kitt Peak || Spacewatch ||  || align=right data-sort-value="0.53" | 530 m || 
|-id=437 bgcolor=#fefefe
| 503437 ||  || — || February 2, 2009 || Kitt Peak || Spacewatch ||  || align=right data-sort-value="0.73" | 730 m || 
|-id=438 bgcolor=#E9E9E9
| 503438 ||  || — || February 27, 2012 || Haleakala || Pan-STARRS || ADE || align=right data-sort-value="0.97" | 970 m || 
|-id=439 bgcolor=#fefefe
| 503439 ||  || — || October 14, 2007 || Kitt Peak || Spacewatch ||  || align=right data-sort-value="0.72" | 720 m || 
|-id=440 bgcolor=#E9E9E9
| 503440 ||  || — || February 10, 2002 || Socorro || LINEAR ||  || align=right | 2.2 km || 
|-id=441 bgcolor=#fefefe
| 503441 ||  || — || June 21, 2006 || Kitt Peak || Spacewatch ||  || align=right data-sort-value="0.94" | 940 m || 
|-id=442 bgcolor=#E9E9E9
| 503442 ||  || — || October 1, 2013 || Mount Lemmon || Mount Lemmon Survey ||  || align=right | 2.1 km || 
|-id=443 bgcolor=#fefefe
| 503443 ||  || — || September 28, 2011 || Mount Lemmon || Mount Lemmon Survey ||  || align=right data-sort-value="0.62" | 620 m || 
|-id=444 bgcolor=#fefefe
| 503444 ||  || — || April 13, 2013 || Haleakala || Pan-STARRS ||  || align=right data-sort-value="0.64" | 640 m || 
|-id=445 bgcolor=#d6d6d6
| 503445 ||  || — || April 5, 2011 || Mount Lemmon || Mount Lemmon Survey ||  || align=right | 3.1 km || 
|-id=446 bgcolor=#fefefe
| 503446 ||  || — || September 5, 1999 || Kitt Peak || Spacewatch || NYS || align=right data-sort-value="0.61" | 610 m || 
|-id=447 bgcolor=#fefefe
| 503447 ||  || — || January 27, 2012 || Mount Lemmon || Mount Lemmon Survey ||  || align=right data-sort-value="0.61" | 610 m || 
|-id=448 bgcolor=#fefefe
| 503448 ||  || — || February 13, 2012 || Kitt Peak || Spacewatch ||  || align=right data-sort-value="0.64" | 640 m || 
|-id=449 bgcolor=#fefefe
| 503449 ||  || — || February 9, 2005 || Kitt Peak || Spacewatch ||  || align=right data-sort-value="0.85" | 850 m || 
|-id=450 bgcolor=#E9E9E9
| 503450 ||  || — || August 14, 2013 || Haleakala || Pan-STARRS ||  || align=right | 2.0 km || 
|-id=451 bgcolor=#fefefe
| 503451 ||  || — || April 17, 2013 || Haleakala || Pan-STARRS ||  || align=right data-sort-value="0.54" | 540 m || 
|-id=452 bgcolor=#E9E9E9
| 503452 ||  || — || March 31, 2008 || Kitt Peak || Spacewatch ||  || align=right data-sort-value="0.75" | 750 m || 
|-id=453 bgcolor=#fefefe
| 503453 ||  || — || April 28, 2009 || Mount Lemmon || Mount Lemmon Survey || NYS || align=right data-sort-value="0.56" | 560 m || 
|-id=454 bgcolor=#E9E9E9
| 503454 ||  || — || March 30, 2008 || Kitt Peak || Spacewatch || BRG || align=right | 1.0 km || 
|-id=455 bgcolor=#fefefe
| 503455 ||  || — || March 11, 2005 || Kitt Peak || Spacewatch ||  || align=right data-sort-value="0.63" | 630 m || 
|-id=456 bgcolor=#fefefe
| 503456 ||  || — || May 7, 2006 || Mount Lemmon || Mount Lemmon Survey ||  || align=right data-sort-value="0.65" | 650 m || 
|-id=457 bgcolor=#fefefe
| 503457 ||  || — || January 11, 2008 || Kitt Peak || Spacewatch ||  || align=right data-sort-value="0.66" | 660 m || 
|-id=458 bgcolor=#E9E9E9
| 503458 ||  || — || March 23, 2012 || Kitt Peak || Spacewatch || ADE || align=right | 1.8 km || 
|-id=459 bgcolor=#fefefe
| 503459 ||  || — || March 21, 2009 || Mount Lemmon || Mount Lemmon Survey || NYS || align=right data-sort-value="0.61" | 610 m || 
|-id=460 bgcolor=#E9E9E9
| 503460 ||  || — || May 10, 2003 || Kitt Peak || Spacewatch ||  || align=right | 2.1 km || 
|-id=461 bgcolor=#fefefe
| 503461 ||  || — || October 14, 2007 || Mount Lemmon || Mount Lemmon Survey ||  || align=right data-sort-value="0.52" | 520 m || 
|-id=462 bgcolor=#E9E9E9
| 503462 ||  || — || April 20, 2012 || Mount Lemmon || Mount Lemmon Survey ||  || align=right | 1.3 km || 
|-id=463 bgcolor=#fefefe
| 503463 ||  || — || January 19, 2012 || Haleakala || Pan-STARRS ||  || align=right data-sort-value="0.77" | 770 m || 
|-id=464 bgcolor=#fefefe
| 503464 ||  || — || July 13, 2013 || Haleakala || Pan-STARRS ||  || align=right data-sort-value="0.72" | 720 m || 
|-id=465 bgcolor=#fefefe
| 503465 ||  || — || December 4, 2007 || Kitt Peak || Spacewatch || NYS || align=right data-sort-value="0.52" | 520 m || 
|-id=466 bgcolor=#fefefe
| 503466 ||  || — || February 23, 2001 || Kitt Peak || Spacewatch ||  || align=right data-sort-value="0.67" | 670 m || 
|-id=467 bgcolor=#fefefe
| 503467 ||  || — || February 10, 2008 || Kitt Peak || Spacewatch ||  || align=right data-sort-value="0.55" | 550 m || 
|-id=468 bgcolor=#E9E9E9
| 503468 ||  || — || September 22, 2009 || Mount Lemmon || Mount Lemmon Survey ||  || align=right data-sort-value="0.74" | 740 m || 
|-id=469 bgcolor=#E9E9E9
| 503469 ||  || — || April 28, 2008 || Kitt Peak || Spacewatch ||  || align=right data-sort-value="0.71" | 710 m || 
|-id=470 bgcolor=#fefefe
| 503470 ||  || — || March 31, 2008 || Mount Lemmon || Mount Lemmon Survey || H || align=right data-sort-value="0.52" | 520 m || 
|-id=471 bgcolor=#fefefe
| 503471 ||  || — || October 23, 2014 || Kitt Peak || Spacewatch ||  || align=right data-sort-value="0.72" | 720 m || 
|-id=472 bgcolor=#E9E9E9
| 503472 ||  || — || March 14, 2007 || Mount Lemmon || Mount Lemmon Survey ||  || align=right | 1.1 km || 
|-id=473 bgcolor=#E9E9E9
| 503473 ||  || — || January 27, 2011 || Mount Lemmon || Mount Lemmon Survey || DOR || align=right | 1.8 km || 
|-id=474 bgcolor=#fefefe
| 503474 ||  || — || January 13, 2008 || Kitt Peak || Spacewatch || NYS || align=right data-sort-value="0.68" | 680 m || 
|-id=475 bgcolor=#fefefe
| 503475 ||  || — || June 2, 2014 || Haleakala || Pan-STARRS || H || align=right data-sort-value="0.69" | 690 m || 
|-id=476 bgcolor=#E9E9E9
| 503476 ||  || — || October 5, 2014 || Haleakala || Pan-STARRS || HNS || align=right | 1.9 km || 
|-id=477 bgcolor=#E9E9E9
| 503477 ||  || — || March 27, 2012 || Mount Lemmon || Mount Lemmon Survey || EUN || align=right | 1.1 km || 
|-id=478 bgcolor=#E9E9E9
| 503478 ||  || — || September 21, 2008 || Mount Lemmon || Mount Lemmon Survey || HNA || align=right | 2.3 km || 
|-id=479 bgcolor=#fefefe
| 503479 ||  || — || May 16, 2013 || Haleakala || Pan-STARRS ||  || align=right data-sort-value="0.62" | 620 m || 
|-id=480 bgcolor=#fefefe
| 503480 ||  || — || January 2, 2012 || Mount Lemmon || Mount Lemmon Survey || V || align=right data-sort-value="0.49" | 490 m || 
|-id=481 bgcolor=#fefefe
| 503481 ||  || — || February 4, 2012 || Haleakala || Pan-STARRS ||  || align=right data-sort-value="0.84" | 840 m || 
|-id=482 bgcolor=#d6d6d6
| 503482 ||  || — || September 14, 2013 || Haleakala || Pan-STARRS ||  || align=right | 2.6 km || 
|-id=483 bgcolor=#d6d6d6
| 503483 ||  || — || February 17, 2010 || Mount Lemmon || Mount Lemmon Survey || EUP || align=right | 3.0 km || 
|-id=484 bgcolor=#E9E9E9
| 503484 ||  || — || February 23, 2012 || Mount Lemmon || Mount Lemmon Survey ||  || align=right | 1.2 km || 
|-id=485 bgcolor=#fefefe
| 503485 ||  || — || September 20, 2014 || Haleakala || Pan-STARRS ||  || align=right data-sort-value="0.62" | 620 m || 
|-id=486 bgcolor=#E9E9E9
| 503486 ||  || — || May 14, 2012 || Haleakala || Pan-STARRS ||  || align=right | 1.0 km || 
|-id=487 bgcolor=#E9E9E9
| 503487 ||  || — || January 6, 2012 || Haleakala || Pan-STARRS ||  || align=right data-sort-value="0.97" | 970 m || 
|-id=488 bgcolor=#fefefe
| 503488 ||  || — || September 20, 2014 || Mount Lemmon || Mount Lemmon Survey ||  || align=right data-sort-value="0.68" | 680 m || 
|-id=489 bgcolor=#E9E9E9
| 503489 ||  || — || September 4, 1999 || Kitt Peak || Spacewatch ||  || align=right | 2.7 km || 
|-id=490 bgcolor=#E9E9E9
| 503490 ||  || — || February 28, 2012 || Haleakala || Pan-STARRS ||  || align=right data-sort-value="0.94" | 940 m || 
|-id=491 bgcolor=#fefefe
| 503491 ||  || — || October 28, 2014 || Haleakala || Pan-STARRS ||  || align=right data-sort-value="0.79" | 790 m || 
|-id=492 bgcolor=#fefefe
| 503492 ||  || — || January 26, 2012 || Mount Lemmon || Mount Lemmon Survey || SVE || align=right data-sort-value="0.73" | 730 m || 
|-id=493 bgcolor=#fefefe
| 503493 ||  || — || January 18, 2009 || Mount Lemmon || Mount Lemmon Survey ||  || align=right data-sort-value="0.94" | 940 m || 
|-id=494 bgcolor=#d6d6d6
| 503494 ||  || — || March 4, 2011 || Kitt Peak || Spacewatch ||  || align=right | 2.9 km || 
|-id=495 bgcolor=#fefefe
| 503495 ||  || — || October 31, 2014 || Kitt Peak || Spacewatch || V || align=right data-sort-value="0.58" | 580 m || 
|-id=496 bgcolor=#FA8072
| 503496 ||  || — || January 20, 2008 || Mount Lemmon || Mount Lemmon Survey || H || align=right data-sort-value="0.45" | 450 m || 
|-id=497 bgcolor=#fefefe
| 503497 ||  || — || August 25, 2014 || Haleakala || Pan-STARRS ||  || align=right data-sort-value="0.84" | 840 m || 
|-id=498 bgcolor=#fefefe
| 503498 ||  || — || March 3, 2009 || Catalina || CSS ||  || align=right data-sort-value="0.69" | 690 m || 
|-id=499 bgcolor=#fefefe
| 503499 ||  || — || July 13, 2013 || Haleakala || Pan-STARRS || NYS || align=right data-sort-value="0.65" | 650 m || 
|-id=500 bgcolor=#fefefe
| 503500 ||  || — || September 29, 2014 || Haleakala || Pan-STARRS ||  || align=right data-sort-value="0.69" | 690 m || 
|}

503501–503600 

|-bgcolor=#E9E9E9
| 503501 ||  || — || March 24, 2012 || Kitt Peak || Spacewatch ||  || align=right | 1.3 km || 
|-id=502 bgcolor=#fefefe
| 503502 ||  || — || July 5, 2010 || Mount Lemmon || Mount Lemmon Survey ||  || align=right data-sort-value="0.63" | 630 m || 
|-id=503 bgcolor=#fefefe
| 503503 ||  || — || January 26, 2012 || Mount Lemmon || Mount Lemmon Survey ||  || align=right data-sort-value="0.64" | 640 m || 
|-id=504 bgcolor=#fefefe
| 503504 ||  || — || June 29, 2014 || Haleakala || Pan-STARRS || H || align=right data-sort-value="0.71" | 710 m || 
|-id=505 bgcolor=#fefefe
| 503505 ||  || — || January 17, 2005 || Kitt Peak || Spacewatch ||  || align=right | 2.5 km || 
|-id=506 bgcolor=#fefefe
| 503506 ||  || — || September 18, 2014 || Haleakala || Pan-STARRS ||  || align=right data-sort-value="0.49" | 490 m || 
|-id=507 bgcolor=#fefefe
| 503507 ||  || — || October 28, 2010 || Mount Lemmon || Mount Lemmon Survey ||  || align=right data-sort-value="0.69" | 690 m || 
|-id=508 bgcolor=#FA8072
| 503508 ||  || — || February 26, 2011 || Kitt Peak || Spacewatch || H || align=right data-sort-value="0.51" | 510 m || 
|-id=509 bgcolor=#fefefe
| 503509 ||  || — || September 27, 2006 || Catalina || CSS || H || align=right data-sort-value="0.95" | 950 m || 
|-id=510 bgcolor=#E9E9E9
| 503510 ||  || — || March 16, 2007 || Mount Lemmon || Mount Lemmon Survey ||  || align=right | 1.7 km || 
|-id=511 bgcolor=#E9E9E9
| 503511 ||  || — || March 11, 2007 || Kitt Peak || Spacewatch ||  || align=right | 2.3 km || 
|-id=512 bgcolor=#fefefe
| 503512 ||  || — || March 4, 2005 || Mount Lemmon || Mount Lemmon Survey || MAS || align=right data-sort-value="0.62" | 620 m || 
|-id=513 bgcolor=#d6d6d6
| 503513 ||  || — || October 2, 2003 || Kitt Peak || Spacewatch ||  || align=right | 3.1 km || 
|-id=514 bgcolor=#fefefe
| 503514 ||  || — || January 30, 2009 || Catalina || CSS ||  || align=right | 3.3 km || 
|-id=515 bgcolor=#E9E9E9
| 503515 ||  || — || November 11, 2004 || Kitt Peak || Spacewatch ||  || align=right | 3.2 km || 
|-id=516 bgcolor=#fefefe
| 503516 ||  || — || January 30, 2012 || Mount Lemmon || Mount Lemmon Survey ||  || align=right data-sort-value="0.83" | 830 m || 
|-id=517 bgcolor=#fefefe
| 503517 ||  || — || January 27, 2012 || Mount Lemmon || Mount Lemmon Survey ||  || align=right data-sort-value="0.93" | 930 m || 
|-id=518 bgcolor=#fefefe
| 503518 ||  || — || January 11, 2008 || Mount Lemmon || Mount Lemmon Survey ||  || align=right data-sort-value="0.71" | 710 m || 
|-id=519 bgcolor=#d6d6d6
| 503519 ||  || — || March 9, 2011 || Mount Lemmon || Mount Lemmon Survey ||  || align=right | 2.5 km || 
|-id=520 bgcolor=#d6d6d6
| 503520 ||  || — || September 10, 2007 || Mount Lemmon || Mount Lemmon Survey ||  || align=right | 2.7 km || 
|-id=521 bgcolor=#d6d6d6
| 503521 ||  || — || January 6, 2010 || Kitt Peak || Spacewatch || HYG || align=right | 3.2 km || 
|-id=522 bgcolor=#fefefe
| 503522 ||  || — || January 15, 2005 || Kitt Peak || Spacewatch || NYS || align=right data-sort-value="0.72" | 720 m || 
|-id=523 bgcolor=#fefefe
| 503523 ||  || — || September 16, 2003 || Anderson Mesa || LONEOS || H || align=right data-sort-value="0.72" | 720 m || 
|-id=524 bgcolor=#d6d6d6
| 503524 ||  || — || May 24, 2006 || Kitt Peak || Spacewatch ||  || align=right | 2.2 km || 
|-id=525 bgcolor=#d6d6d6
| 503525 ||  || — || May 1, 2011 || Haleakala || Pan-STARRS || VER || align=right | 2.5 km || 
|-id=526 bgcolor=#E9E9E9
| 503526 ||  || — || September 17, 2009 || Kitt Peak || Spacewatch ||  || align=right data-sort-value="0.94" | 940 m || 
|-id=527 bgcolor=#d6d6d6
| 503527 ||  || — || February 10, 2010 || Kitt Peak || Spacewatch || HYG || align=right | 2.7 km || 
|-id=528 bgcolor=#d6d6d6
| 503528 ||  || — || December 21, 2008 || Mount Lemmon || Mount Lemmon Survey ||  || align=right | 3.2 km || 
|-id=529 bgcolor=#E9E9E9
| 503529 ||  || — || August 8, 2004 || Socorro || LINEAR ||  || align=right | 1.5 km || 
|-id=530 bgcolor=#E9E9E9
| 503530 ||  || — || March 12, 2007 || Mount Lemmon || Mount Lemmon Survey ||  || align=right | 1.4 km || 
|-id=531 bgcolor=#E9E9E9
| 503531 ||  || — || April 20, 2007 || Kitt Peak || Spacewatch ||  || align=right | 2.4 km || 
|-id=532 bgcolor=#E9E9E9
| 503532 ||  || — || January 13, 2011 || Mount Lemmon || Mount Lemmon Survey ||  || align=right data-sort-value="0.90" | 900 m || 
|-id=533 bgcolor=#d6d6d6
| 503533 ||  || — || April 27, 2011 || Kitt Peak || Spacewatch ||  || align=right | 2.5 km || 
|-id=534 bgcolor=#fefefe
| 503534 ||  || — || January 11, 2008 || Kitt Peak || Spacewatch ||  || align=right data-sort-value="0.89" | 890 m || 
|-id=535 bgcolor=#fefefe
| 503535 ||  || — || December 27, 2011 || Mount Lemmon || Mount Lemmon Survey ||  || align=right data-sort-value="0.66" | 660 m || 
|-id=536 bgcolor=#fefefe
| 503536 ||  || — || April 24, 2009 || Mount Lemmon || Mount Lemmon Survey ||  || align=right data-sort-value="0.64" | 640 m || 
|-id=537 bgcolor=#fefefe
| 503537 ||  || — || April 11, 2005 || Mount Lemmon || Mount Lemmon Survey || MAS || align=right data-sort-value="0.88" | 880 m || 
|-id=538 bgcolor=#fefefe
| 503538 ||  || — || October 28, 2010 || Catalina || CSS ||  || align=right data-sort-value="0.81" | 810 m || 
|-id=539 bgcolor=#E9E9E9
| 503539 ||  || — || March 26, 2007 || Mount Lemmon || Mount Lemmon Survey || HOF || align=right | 2.1 km || 
|-id=540 bgcolor=#E9E9E9
| 503540 ||  || — || September 10, 2004 || Kitt Peak || Spacewatch ||  || align=right | 1.3 km || 
|-id=541 bgcolor=#fefefe
| 503541 ||  || — || April 18, 2009 || Mount Lemmon || Mount Lemmon Survey ||  || align=right data-sort-value="0.54" | 540 m || 
|-id=542 bgcolor=#E9E9E9
| 503542 ||  || — || January 23, 2006 || Mount Lemmon || Mount Lemmon Survey || HOF || align=right | 1.8 km || 
|-id=543 bgcolor=#E9E9E9
| 503543 ||  || — || January 27, 2011 || Mount Lemmon || Mount Lemmon Survey ||  || align=right | 1.2 km || 
|-id=544 bgcolor=#E9E9E9
| 503544 ||  || — || April 15, 2008 || Mount Lemmon || Mount Lemmon Survey ||  || align=right | 1.0 km || 
|-id=545 bgcolor=#E9E9E9
| 503545 ||  || — || October 8, 2004 || Kitt Peak || Spacewatch || MIS || align=right | 1.4 km || 
|-id=546 bgcolor=#E9E9E9
| 503546 ||  || — || October 6, 2004 || Kitt Peak || Spacewatch ||  || align=right | 1.9 km || 
|-id=547 bgcolor=#E9E9E9
| 503547 ||  || — || September 22, 2008 || Kitt Peak || Spacewatch || DOR || align=right | 2.3 km || 
|-id=548 bgcolor=#fefefe
| 503548 ||  || — || October 18, 1998 || Kitt Peak || Spacewatch || MAS || align=right data-sort-value="0.98" | 980 m || 
|-id=549 bgcolor=#E9E9E9
| 503549 ||  || — || June 10, 2012 || Haleakala || Pan-STARRS ||  || align=right | 2.2 km || 
|-id=550 bgcolor=#d6d6d6
| 503550 ||  || — || December 1, 2014 || Haleakala || Pan-STARRS || TIR || align=right | 3.3 km || 
|-id=551 bgcolor=#fefefe
| 503551 ||  || — || November 15, 2011 || Kitt Peak || Spacewatch ||  || align=right data-sort-value="0.80" | 800 m || 
|-id=552 bgcolor=#E9E9E9
| 503552 ||  || — || February 26, 2007 || Mount Lemmon || Mount Lemmon Survey || WIT || align=right | 2.3 km || 
|-id=553 bgcolor=#fefefe
| 503553 ||  || — || April 13, 2013 || Haleakala || Pan-STARRS ||  || align=right data-sort-value="0.53" | 530 m || 
|-id=554 bgcolor=#fefefe
| 503554 ||  || — || September 10, 2010 || Kitt Peak || Spacewatch ||  || align=right data-sort-value="0.83" | 830 m || 
|-id=555 bgcolor=#E9E9E9
| 503555 ||  || — || November 17, 2009 || Mount Lemmon || Mount Lemmon Survey || AGN || align=right | 1.3 km || 
|-id=556 bgcolor=#fefefe
| 503556 ||  || — || April 18, 2009 || Mount Lemmon || Mount Lemmon Survey ||  || align=right data-sort-value="0.59" | 590 m || 
|-id=557 bgcolor=#d6d6d6
| 503557 ||  || — || February 9, 2005 || Mount Lemmon || Mount Lemmon Survey || EMA || align=right | 2.3 km || 
|-id=558 bgcolor=#fefefe
| 503558 ||  || — || March 2, 2009 || Kitt Peak || Spacewatch ||  || align=right data-sort-value="0.66" | 660 m || 
|-id=559 bgcolor=#fefefe
| 503559 ||  || — || September 18, 2006 || Catalina || CSS ||  || align=right data-sort-value="0.87" | 870 m || 
|-id=560 bgcolor=#E9E9E9
| 503560 ||  || — || December 28, 2005 || Kitt Peak || Spacewatch ||  || align=right | 1.5 km || 
|-id=561 bgcolor=#E9E9E9
| 503561 ||  || — || November 13, 2006 || Kitt Peak || Spacewatch ||  || align=right data-sort-value="0.97" | 970 m || 
|-id=562 bgcolor=#E9E9E9
| 503562 ||  || — || August 12, 2008 || La Sagra || OAM Obs. ||  || align=right | 2.3 km || 
|-id=563 bgcolor=#E9E9E9
| 503563 ||  || — || April 29, 2012 || Kitt Peak || Spacewatch ||  || align=right | 1.3 km || 
|-id=564 bgcolor=#fefefe
| 503564 ||  || — || November 26, 2011 || Kitt Peak || Spacewatch ||  || align=right data-sort-value="0.69" | 690 m || 
|-id=565 bgcolor=#E9E9E9
| 503565 ||  || — || October 13, 2005 || Kitt Peak || Spacewatch ||  || align=right | 1.1 km || 
|-id=566 bgcolor=#d6d6d6
| 503566 ||  || — || October 2, 2008 || Mount Lemmon || Mount Lemmon Survey || TIR || align=right | 2.1 km || 
|-id=567 bgcolor=#E9E9E9
| 503567 ||  || — || June 30, 2008 || Kitt Peak || Spacewatch ||  || align=right | 2.2 km || 
|-id=568 bgcolor=#d6d6d6
| 503568 ||  || — || October 8, 2008 || Kitt Peak || Spacewatch || KOR || align=right | 2.5 km || 
|-id=569 bgcolor=#fefefe
| 503569 ||  || — || July 14, 2013 || Haleakala || Pan-STARRS || MAS || align=right data-sort-value="0.68" | 680 m || 
|-id=570 bgcolor=#fefefe
| 503570 ||  || — || January 31, 2009 || Kitt Peak || Spacewatch ||  || align=right data-sort-value="0.74" | 740 m || 
|-id=571 bgcolor=#E9E9E9
| 503571 ||  || — || March 23, 2003 || Kitt Peak || Spacewatch ||  || align=right | 1.1 km || 
|-id=572 bgcolor=#fefefe
| 503572 ||  || — || October 12, 2010 || Mount Lemmon || Mount Lemmon Survey ||  || align=right data-sort-value="0.73" | 730 m || 
|-id=573 bgcolor=#E9E9E9
| 503573 ||  || — || August 30, 2005 || Kitt Peak || Spacewatch ||  || align=right data-sort-value="0.93" | 930 m || 
|-id=574 bgcolor=#E9E9E9
| 503574 ||  || — || September 29, 2005 || Mount Lemmon || Mount Lemmon Survey ||  || align=right | 1.2 km || 
|-id=575 bgcolor=#E9E9E9
| 503575 ||  || — || February 23, 2007 || Kitt Peak || Spacewatch ||  || align=right | 1.3 km || 
|-id=576 bgcolor=#fefefe
| 503576 ||  || — || September 17, 2006 || Kitt Peak || Spacewatch ||  || align=right data-sort-value="0.61" | 610 m || 
|-id=577 bgcolor=#fefefe
| 503577 ||  || — || November 2, 2007 || Mount Lemmon || Mount Lemmon Survey ||  || align=right data-sort-value="0.62" | 620 m || 
|-id=578 bgcolor=#d6d6d6
| 503578 ||  || — || April 30, 2011 || Mount Lemmon || Mount Lemmon Survey ||  || align=right | 1.9 km || 
|-id=579 bgcolor=#d6d6d6
| 503579 ||  || — || February 14, 2010 || Mount Lemmon || Mount Lemmon Survey || HYG || align=right | 3.2 km || 
|-id=580 bgcolor=#fefefe
| 503580 ||  || — || October 16, 2003 || Kitt Peak || Spacewatch ||  || align=right data-sort-value="0.78" | 780 m || 
|-id=581 bgcolor=#E9E9E9
| 503581 ||  || — || April 12, 2008 || Kitt Peak || Spacewatch ||  || align=right data-sort-value="0.97" | 970 m || 
|-id=582 bgcolor=#fefefe
| 503582 ||  || — || August 20, 2003 || Campo Imperatore || CINEOS ||  || align=right data-sort-value="0.73" | 730 m || 
|-id=583 bgcolor=#E9E9E9
| 503583 ||  || — || April 29, 2008 || Mount Lemmon || Mount Lemmon Survey ||  || align=right data-sort-value="0.87" | 870 m || 
|-id=584 bgcolor=#E9E9E9
| 503584 ||  || — || April 13, 2004 || Kitt Peak || Spacewatch ||  || align=right data-sort-value="0.91" | 910 m || 
|-id=585 bgcolor=#fefefe
| 503585 ||  || — || September 10, 2007 || Kitt Peak || Spacewatch ||  || align=right data-sort-value="0.59" | 590 m || 
|-id=586 bgcolor=#d6d6d6
| 503586 ||  || — || September 17, 1995 || Kitt Peak || Spacewatch || BGL || align=right | 2.7 km || 
|-id=587 bgcolor=#E9E9E9
| 503587 ||  || — || December 22, 2005 || Kitt Peak || Spacewatch ||  || align=right | 1.7 km || 
|-id=588 bgcolor=#E9E9E9
| 503588 ||  || — || November 22, 2014 || Mount Lemmon || Mount Lemmon Survey ||  || align=right data-sort-value="0.69" | 690 m || 
|-id=589 bgcolor=#fefefe
| 503589 ||  || — || March 16, 2009 || Kitt Peak || Spacewatch ||  || align=right data-sort-value="0.61" | 610 m || 
|-id=590 bgcolor=#E9E9E9
| 503590 ||  || — || July 6, 2005 || Kitt Peak || Spacewatch ||  || align=right | 1.0 km || 
|-id=591 bgcolor=#fefefe
| 503591 ||  || — || September 26, 2006 || Mount Lemmon || Mount Lemmon Survey ||  || align=right data-sort-value="0.64" | 640 m || 
|-id=592 bgcolor=#fefefe
| 503592 ||  || — || January 15, 2008 || Mount Lemmon || Mount Lemmon Survey || NYS || align=right data-sort-value="0.65" | 650 m || 
|-id=593 bgcolor=#d6d6d6
| 503593 ||  || — || December 26, 2014 || Haleakala || Pan-STARRS ||  || align=right | 2.2 km || 
|-id=594 bgcolor=#E9E9E9
| 503594 ||  || — || December 30, 2005 || Kitt Peak || Spacewatch || AEO || align=right | 2.0 km || 
|-id=595 bgcolor=#E9E9E9
| 503595 ||  || — || April 21, 2012 || Mount Lemmon || Mount Lemmon Survey || WIT || align=right | 1.4 km || 
|-id=596 bgcolor=#fefefe
| 503596 ||  || — || September 18, 2006 || Kitt Peak || Spacewatch ||  || align=right data-sort-value="0.62" | 620 m || 
|-id=597 bgcolor=#E9E9E9
| 503597 ||  || — || October 24, 2013 || Mount Lemmon || Mount Lemmon Survey || AEO || align=right | 1.8 km || 
|-id=598 bgcolor=#E9E9E9
| 503598 ||  || — || October 6, 2013 || Kitt Peak || Spacewatch ||  || align=right | 1.5 km || 
|-id=599 bgcolor=#E9E9E9
| 503599 ||  || — || October 27, 2009 || Kitt Peak || Spacewatch ||  || align=right | 1.3 km || 
|-id=600 bgcolor=#E9E9E9
| 503600 ||  || — || January 10, 2007 || Kitt Peak || Spacewatch ||  || align=right | 1.4 km || 
|}

503601–503700 

|-bgcolor=#E9E9E9
| 503601 ||  || — || April 25, 2007 || Kitt Peak || Spacewatch ||  || align=right | 2.4 km || 
|-id=602 bgcolor=#E9E9E9
| 503602 ||  || — || September 25, 2013 || Catalina || CSS ||  || align=right | 1.9 km || 
|-id=603 bgcolor=#fefefe
| 503603 ||  || — || January 18, 2012 || Mount Lemmon || Mount Lemmon Survey ||  || align=right data-sort-value="0.72" | 720 m || 
|-id=604 bgcolor=#d6d6d6
| 503604 ||  || — || May 29, 2011 || Mount Lemmon || Mount Lemmon Survey ||  || align=right | 2.5 km || 
|-id=605 bgcolor=#E9E9E9
| 503605 ||  || — || February 25, 2011 || Mount Lemmon || Mount Lemmon Survey ||  || align=right | 1.2 km || 
|-id=606 bgcolor=#E9E9E9
| 503606 ||  || — || March 5, 2002 || Kitt Peak || Spacewatch || NEM || align=right | 1.6 km || 
|-id=607 bgcolor=#E9E9E9
| 503607 ||  || — || July 16, 2013 || Haleakala || Pan-STARRS ||  || align=right data-sort-value="0.93" | 930 m || 
|-id=608 bgcolor=#E9E9E9
| 503608 ||  || — || April 22, 2007 || Mount Lemmon || Mount Lemmon Survey ||  || align=right | 1.7 km || 
|-id=609 bgcolor=#d6d6d6
| 503609 ||  || — || February 15, 2010 || Kitt Peak || Spacewatch || THM || align=right | 2.2 km || 
|-id=610 bgcolor=#E9E9E9
| 503610 ||  || — || October 6, 2004 || Kitt Peak || Spacewatch ||  || align=right | 2.4 km || 
|-id=611 bgcolor=#E9E9E9
| 503611 ||  || — || January 29, 2011 || Mount Lemmon || Mount Lemmon Survey ||  || align=right | 1.4 km || 
|-id=612 bgcolor=#fefefe
| 503612 ||  || — || July 14, 2013 || Haleakala || Pan-STARRS || MAS || align=right data-sort-value="0.75" | 750 m || 
|-id=613 bgcolor=#E9E9E9
| 503613 ||  || — || March 14, 2007 || Mount Lemmon || Mount Lemmon Survey ||  || align=right | 1.7 km || 
|-id=614 bgcolor=#d6d6d6
| 503614 ||  || — || February 15, 2010 || Mount Lemmon || Mount Lemmon Survey ||  || align=right | 2.4 km || 
|-id=615 bgcolor=#fefefe
| 503615 ||  || — || October 10, 2004 || Kitt Peak || Spacewatch ||  || align=right data-sort-value="0.65" | 650 m || 
|-id=616 bgcolor=#fefefe
| 503616 ||  || — || March 3, 2005 || Kitt Peak || Spacewatch ||  || align=right data-sort-value="0.90" | 900 m || 
|-id=617 bgcolor=#fefefe
| 503617 ||  || — || February 27, 2009 || Kitt Peak || Spacewatch ||  || align=right data-sort-value="0.54" | 540 m || 
|-id=618 bgcolor=#E9E9E9
| 503618 ||  || — || December 30, 2005 || Kitt Peak || Spacewatch || NEM || align=right | 2.2 km || 
|-id=619 bgcolor=#d6d6d6
| 503619 ||  || — || October 7, 2007 || Kitt Peak || Spacewatch ||  || align=right | 2.9 km || 
|-id=620 bgcolor=#fefefe
| 503620 ||  || — || March 4, 2005 || Kitt Peak || Spacewatch || MAS || align=right data-sort-value="0.65" | 650 m || 
|-id=621 bgcolor=#fefefe
| 503621 ||  || — || August 21, 2006 || Kitt Peak || Spacewatch ||  || align=right data-sort-value="0.56" | 560 m || 
|-id=622 bgcolor=#E9E9E9
| 503622 ||  || — || December 13, 2010 || Mount Lemmon || Mount Lemmon Survey ||  || align=right | 1.3 km || 
|-id=623 bgcolor=#fefefe
| 503623 ||  || — || January 2, 2012 || Mount Lemmon || Mount Lemmon Survey || V || align=right data-sort-value="0.53" | 530 m || 
|-id=624 bgcolor=#fefefe
| 503624 ||  || — || March 3, 2005 || Catalina || CSS || NYS || align=right data-sort-value="0.59" | 590 m || 
|-id=625 bgcolor=#fefefe
| 503625 ||  || — || August 23, 1998 || Xinglong || SCAP || H || align=right data-sort-value="0.53" | 530 m || 
|-id=626 bgcolor=#fefefe
| 503626 ||  || — || October 10, 2010 || Mount Lemmon || Mount Lemmon Survey ||  || align=right | 1.1 km || 
|-id=627 bgcolor=#E9E9E9
| 503627 ||  || — || March 16, 2007 || Mount Lemmon || Mount Lemmon Survey ||  || align=right | 1.3 km || 
|-id=628 bgcolor=#E9E9E9
| 503628 ||  || — || March 7, 2011 || Piszkéstető Stn. || K. Sárneczky, J. Kelemen ||  || align=right | 1.5 km || 
|-id=629 bgcolor=#E9E9E9
| 503629 ||  || — || January 17, 2007 || Catalina || CSS || EUN || align=right | 1.8 km || 
|-id=630 bgcolor=#fefefe
| 503630 ||  || — || October 21, 2003 || Kitt Peak || Spacewatch || V || align=right data-sort-value="0.57" | 570 m || 
|-id=631 bgcolor=#fefefe
| 503631 ||  || — || October 5, 2014 || Mount Lemmon || Mount Lemmon Survey ||  || align=right data-sort-value="0.55" | 550 m || 
|-id=632 bgcolor=#fefefe
| 503632 ||  || — || April 30, 2005 || Kitt Peak || Spacewatch || MAS || align=right data-sort-value="0.67" | 670 m || 
|-id=633 bgcolor=#E9E9E9
| 503633 ||  || — || April 15, 2007 || Kitt Peak || Spacewatch ||  || align=right | 2.2 km || 
|-id=634 bgcolor=#d6d6d6
| 503634 ||  || — || November 9, 2013 || Haleakala || Pan-STARRS ||  || align=right | 3.0 km || 
|-id=635 bgcolor=#fefefe
| 503635 ||  || — || March 4, 2008 || Kitt Peak || Spacewatch ||  || align=right data-sort-value="0.98" | 980 m || 
|-id=636 bgcolor=#E9E9E9
| 503636 ||  || — || April 24, 2012 || Haleakala || Pan-STARRS ||  || align=right data-sort-value="0.95" | 950 m || 
|-id=637 bgcolor=#E9E9E9
| 503637 ||  || — || March 13, 2007 || Mount Lemmon || Mount Lemmon Survey ||  || align=right | 2.4 km || 
|-id=638 bgcolor=#fefefe
| 503638 ||  || — || May 20, 2006 || Mount Lemmon || Mount Lemmon Survey ||  || align=right data-sort-value="0.95" | 950 m || 
|-id=639 bgcolor=#E9E9E9
| 503639 ||  || — || April 6, 2008 || Kitt Peak || Spacewatch ||  || align=right data-sort-value="0.77" | 770 m || 
|-id=640 bgcolor=#d6d6d6
| 503640 ||  || — || May 3, 2005 || Kitt Peak || Spacewatch ||  || align=right | 2.0 km || 
|-id=641 bgcolor=#fefefe
| 503641 ||  || — || January 16, 2015 || Haleakala || Pan-STARRS ||  || align=right data-sort-value="0.83" | 830 m || 
|-id=642 bgcolor=#E9E9E9
| 503642 ||  || — || March 27, 2011 || Mount Lemmon || Mount Lemmon Survey ||  || align=right | 1.7 km || 
|-id=643 bgcolor=#d6d6d6
| 503643 ||  || — || February 14, 2010 || Kitt Peak || Spacewatch || EOS || align=right | 2.0 km || 
|-id=644 bgcolor=#d6d6d6
| 503644 ||  || — || June 4, 2011 || Mount Lemmon || Mount Lemmon Survey ||  || align=right | 2.7 km || 
|-id=645 bgcolor=#E9E9E9
| 503645 ||  || — || June 22, 1995 || Kitt Peak || Spacewatch ||  || align=right | 1.8 km || 
|-id=646 bgcolor=#fefefe
| 503646 ||  || — || February 28, 2009 || Mount Lemmon || Mount Lemmon Survey ||  || align=right data-sort-value="0.60" | 600 m || 
|-id=647 bgcolor=#E9E9E9
| 503647 ||  || — || September 7, 2008 || Mount Lemmon || Mount Lemmon Survey ||  || align=right | 1.5 km || 
|-id=648 bgcolor=#E9E9E9
| 503648 ||  || — || March 26, 2011 || Mount Lemmon || Mount Lemmon Survey || CLO || align=right | 2.0 km || 
|-id=649 bgcolor=#E9E9E9
| 503649 ||  || — || January 26, 2011 || Kitt Peak || Spacewatch ||  || align=right | 1.7 km || 
|-id=650 bgcolor=#fefefe
| 503650 ||  || — || September 19, 2010 || Kitt Peak || Spacewatch ||  || align=right data-sort-value="0.81" | 810 m || 
|-id=651 bgcolor=#fefefe
| 503651 ||  || — || November 3, 2010 || Mount Lemmon || Mount Lemmon Survey ||  || align=right data-sort-value="0.94" | 940 m || 
|-id=652 bgcolor=#E9E9E9
| 503652 ||  || — || May 16, 2012 || Kitt Peak || Spacewatch || MAR || align=right | 1.0 km || 
|-id=653 bgcolor=#fefefe
| 503653 ||  || — || March 1, 2005 || Kitt Peak || Spacewatch ||  || align=right data-sort-value="0.88" | 880 m || 
|-id=654 bgcolor=#E9E9E9
| 503654 ||  || — || March 7, 2008 || Mount Lemmon || Mount Lemmon Survey || ADE || align=right | 1.1 km || 
|-id=655 bgcolor=#d6d6d6
| 503655 ||  || — || January 16, 2010 || WISE || WISE || URS || align=right | 3.4 km || 
|-id=656 bgcolor=#E9E9E9
| 503656 ||  || — || November 9, 2009 || Mount Lemmon || Mount Lemmon Survey ||  || align=right | 2.8 km || 
|-id=657 bgcolor=#E9E9E9
| 503657 ||  || — || August 18, 2004 || Siding Spring || SSS ||  || align=right | 2.4 km || 
|-id=658 bgcolor=#E9E9E9
| 503658 ||  || — || May 18, 2007 || Kitt Peak || Spacewatch ||  || align=right | 1.7 km || 
|-id=659 bgcolor=#d6d6d6
| 503659 ||  || — || July 25, 2011 || Haleakala || Pan-STARRS ||  || align=right | 2.9 km || 
|-id=660 bgcolor=#fefefe
| 503660 ||  || — || January 31, 2009 || Mount Lemmon || Mount Lemmon Survey ||  || align=right data-sort-value="0.64" | 640 m || 
|-id=661 bgcolor=#d6d6d6
| 503661 ||  || — || November 18, 2003 || Kitt Peak || Spacewatch ||  || align=right | 2.6 km || 
|-id=662 bgcolor=#d6d6d6
| 503662 ||  || — || July 10, 2010 || WISE || WISE || Tj (2.97) || align=right | 2.9 km || 
|-id=663 bgcolor=#fefefe
| 503663 ||  || — || January 31, 2006 || Mount Lemmon || Mount Lemmon Survey ||  || align=right data-sort-value="0.75" | 750 m || 
|-id=664 bgcolor=#E9E9E9
| 503664 ||  || — || May 14, 2004 || Kitt Peak || Spacewatch ||  || align=right data-sort-value="0.82" | 820 m || 
|-id=665 bgcolor=#E9E9E9
| 503665 ||  || — || October 7, 2004 || Kitt Peak || Spacewatch ||  || align=right | 2.1 km || 
|-id=666 bgcolor=#d6d6d6
| 503666 ||  || — || February 2, 2005 || Kitt Peak || Spacewatch ||  || align=right | 2.7 km || 
|-id=667 bgcolor=#E9E9E9
| 503667 ||  || — || December 21, 2006 || Kitt Peak || Spacewatch ||  || align=right data-sort-value="0.90" | 900 m || 
|-id=668 bgcolor=#E9E9E9
| 503668 ||  || — || November 26, 2005 || Mount Lemmon || Mount Lemmon Survey ||  || align=right | 1.2 km || 
|-id=669 bgcolor=#fefefe
| 503669 ||  || — || October 27, 2006 || Mount Lemmon || Mount Lemmon Survey || MAS || align=right data-sort-value="0.65" | 650 m || 
|-id=670 bgcolor=#E9E9E9
| 503670 ||  || — || November 25, 2009 || Kitt Peak || Spacewatch ||  || align=right | 1.7 km || 
|-id=671 bgcolor=#E9E9E9
| 503671 ||  || — || March 24, 2003 || Kitt Peak || Spacewatch || ADE || align=right | 2.1 km || 
|-id=672 bgcolor=#fefefe
| 503672 ||  || — || October 2, 2013 || Haleakala || Pan-STARRS ||  || align=right data-sort-value="0.67" | 670 m || 
|-id=673 bgcolor=#E9E9E9
| 503673 ||  || — || January 4, 2011 || Mount Lemmon || Mount Lemmon Survey ||  || align=right | 1.0 km || 
|-id=674 bgcolor=#fefefe
| 503674 ||  || — || May 30, 2011 || Haleakala || Pan-STARRS || H || align=right data-sort-value="0.85" | 850 m || 
|-id=675 bgcolor=#E9E9E9
| 503675 ||  || — || May 19, 2012 || Mount Lemmon || Mount Lemmon Survey ||  || align=right | 1.4 km || 
|-id=676 bgcolor=#d6d6d6
| 503676 ||  || — || April 9, 2010 || Mount Lemmon || Mount Lemmon Survey ||  || align=right | 2.7 km || 
|-id=677 bgcolor=#E9E9E9
| 503677 ||  || — || February 13, 2011 || Mount Lemmon || Mount Lemmon Survey ||  || align=right | 1.3 km || 
|-id=678 bgcolor=#d6d6d6
| 503678 ||  || — || January 20, 2010 || WISE || WISE ||  || align=right | 4.0 km || 
|-id=679 bgcolor=#E9E9E9
| 503679 ||  || — || September 16, 2003 || Kitt Peak || Spacewatch ||  || align=right | 1.8 km || 
|-id=680 bgcolor=#E9E9E9
| 503680 ||  || — || September 28, 2009 || Mount Lemmon || Mount Lemmon Survey || WIT || align=right | 1.6 km || 
|-id=681 bgcolor=#d6d6d6
| 503681 ||  || — || January 23, 2015 || Haleakala || Pan-STARRS ||  || align=right | 3.7 km || 
|-id=682 bgcolor=#fefefe
| 503682 ||  || — || October 31, 2010 || Kitt Peak || Spacewatch ||  || align=right | 1.2 km || 
|-id=683 bgcolor=#d6d6d6
| 503683 ||  || — || May 15, 2005 || Mount Lemmon || Mount Lemmon Survey || LIX || align=right | 2.9 km || 
|-id=684 bgcolor=#fefefe
| 503684 ||  || — || September 6, 2014 || Mount Lemmon || Mount Lemmon Survey ||  || align=right data-sort-value="0.88" | 880 m || 
|-id=685 bgcolor=#d6d6d6
| 503685 ||  || — || October 12, 2007 || Catalina || CSS ||  || align=right | 4.1 km || 
|-id=686 bgcolor=#E9E9E9
| 503686 ||  || — || January 16, 2011 || Mount Lemmon || Mount Lemmon Survey ||  || align=right | 1.8 km || 
|-id=687 bgcolor=#d6d6d6
| 503687 ||  || — || November 8, 2013 || Mount Lemmon || Mount Lemmon Survey ||  || align=right | 1.7 km || 
|-id=688 bgcolor=#E9E9E9
| 503688 ||  || — || November 9, 2013 || Mount Lemmon || Mount Lemmon Survey ||  || align=right | 1.8 km || 
|-id=689 bgcolor=#d6d6d6
| 503689 ||  || — || December 21, 2014 || Haleakala || Pan-STARRS || KOR || align=right | 1.8 km || 
|-id=690 bgcolor=#fefefe
| 503690 ||  || — || October 11, 2007 || Mount Lemmon || Mount Lemmon Survey ||  || align=right data-sort-value="0.58" | 580 m || 
|-id=691 bgcolor=#fefefe
| 503691 ||  || — || October 18, 2007 || Mount Lemmon || Mount Lemmon Survey ||  || align=right data-sort-value="0.58" | 580 m || 
|-id=692 bgcolor=#d6d6d6
| 503692 ||  || — || April 27, 2000 || Kitt Peak || Spacewatch ||  || align=right | 3.1 km || 
|-id=693 bgcolor=#E9E9E9
| 503693 ||  || — || October 18, 2009 || Mount Lemmon || Mount Lemmon Survey ||  || align=right | 1.4 km || 
|-id=694 bgcolor=#E9E9E9
| 503694 ||  || — || April 25, 2003 || Kitt Peak || Spacewatch ||  || align=right | 1.7 km || 
|-id=695 bgcolor=#d6d6d6
| 503695 ||  || — || May 27, 2010 || WISE || WISE || EUP || align=right | 3.8 km || 
|-id=696 bgcolor=#E9E9E9
| 503696 ||  || — || December 11, 2014 || Mount Lemmon || Mount Lemmon Survey ||  || align=right | 1.9 km || 
|-id=697 bgcolor=#E9E9E9
| 503697 ||  || — || April 15, 2007 || Kitt Peak || Spacewatch || WIT || align=right | 1.9 km || 
|-id=698 bgcolor=#E9E9E9
| 503698 ||  || — || January 25, 2006 || Kitt Peak || Spacewatch || WIT || align=right | 1.9 km || 
|-id=699 bgcolor=#fefefe
| 503699 ||  || — || July 14, 2013 || Haleakala || Pan-STARRS ||  || align=right data-sort-value="0.63" | 630 m || 
|-id=700 bgcolor=#d6d6d6
| 503700 ||  || — || October 4, 2012 || Mount Lemmon || Mount Lemmon Survey ||  || align=right | 2.9 km || 
|}

503701–503800 

|-bgcolor=#d6d6d6
| 503701 ||  || — || November 27, 2013 || Haleakala || Pan-STARRS ||  || align=right | 2.7 km || 
|-id=702 bgcolor=#d6d6d6
| 503702 ||  || — || December 22, 2008 || Kitt Peak || Spacewatch ||  || align=right | 2.8 km || 
|-id=703 bgcolor=#E9E9E9
| 503703 ||  || — || February 5, 2010 || WISE || WISE ||  || align=right | 3.2 km || 
|-id=704 bgcolor=#E9E9E9
| 503704 ||  || — || October 2, 2013 || Haleakala || Pan-STARRS || MAR || align=right | 1.8 km || 
|-id=705 bgcolor=#d6d6d6
| 503705 ||  || — || August 27, 2006 || Kitt Peak || Spacewatch ||  || align=right | 2.9 km || 
|-id=706 bgcolor=#E9E9E9
| 503706 ||  || — || January 12, 2016 || Haleakala || Pan-STARRS ||  || align=right | 1.5 km || 
|-id=707 bgcolor=#d6d6d6
| 503707 ||  || — || January 21, 2015 || Mount Lemmon || Mount Lemmon Survey ||  || align=right | 2.9 km || 
|-id=708 bgcolor=#E9E9E9
| 503708 ||  || — || January 17, 2015 || Haleakala || Pan-STARRS ||  || align=right | 1.3 km || 
|-id=709 bgcolor=#fefefe
| 503709 ||  || — || November 21, 2006 || Mount Lemmon || Mount Lemmon Survey ||  || align=right data-sort-value="0.93" | 930 m || 
|-id=710 bgcolor=#E9E9E9
| 503710 ||  || — || February 16, 2001 || Kitt Peak || Spacewatch ||  || align=right | 2.3 km || 
|-id=711 bgcolor=#d6d6d6
| 503711 ||  || — || October 11, 2007 || Mount Lemmon || Mount Lemmon Survey ||  || align=right | 2.5 km || 
|-id=712 bgcolor=#d6d6d6
| 503712 ||  || — || April 12, 2005 || Kitt Peak || Spacewatch ||  || align=right | 2.9 km || 
|-id=713 bgcolor=#fefefe
| 503713 ||  || — || April 12, 2005 || Kitt Peak || Spacewatch ||  || align=right data-sort-value="0.73" | 730 m || 
|-id=714 bgcolor=#d6d6d6
| 503714 ||  || — || September 27, 2005 || Kitt Peak || Spacewatch || 7:4 || align=right | 2.9 km || 
|-id=715 bgcolor=#fefefe
| 503715 ||  || — || September 19, 2010 || Kitt Peak || Spacewatch ||  || align=right data-sort-value="0.79" | 790 m || 
|-id=716 bgcolor=#E9E9E9
| 503716 ||  || — || January 23, 2006 || Kitt Peak || Spacewatch || AGN || align=right | 2.3 km || 
|-id=717 bgcolor=#fefefe
| 503717 ||  || — || July 13, 2013 || Haleakala || Pan-STARRS ||  || align=right data-sort-value="0.60" | 600 m || 
|-id=718 bgcolor=#d6d6d6
| 503718 ||  || — || April 5, 2010 || Kitt Peak || Spacewatch ||  || align=right | 3.6 km || 
|-id=719 bgcolor=#d6d6d6
| 503719 ||  || — || February 14, 2010 || Kitt Peak || Spacewatch ||  || align=right | 2.0 km || 
|-id=720 bgcolor=#E9E9E9
| 503720 ||  || — || January 30, 2011 || Haleakala || Pan-STARRS ||  || align=right | 1.4 km || 
|-id=721 bgcolor=#E9E9E9
| 503721 ||  || — || March 21, 2002 || Campo Imperatore || CINEOS || DOR || align=right | 2.4 km || 
|-id=722 bgcolor=#d6d6d6
| 503722 ||  || — || February 16, 2004 || Kitt Peak || Spacewatch || EOS || align=right | 3.8 km || 
|-id=723 bgcolor=#E9E9E9
| 503723 ||  || — || October 7, 2004 || Kitt Peak || Spacewatch || EUN || align=right | 1.7 km || 
|-id=724 bgcolor=#E9E9E9
| 503724 ||  || — || May 15, 2012 || Haleakala || Pan-STARRS || ADE || align=right | 1.3 km || 
|-id=725 bgcolor=#d6d6d6
| 503725 ||  || — || September 12, 2007 || Catalina || CSS || EOS || align=right | 3.4 km || 
|-id=726 bgcolor=#E9E9E9
| 503726 ||  || — || March 25, 2007 || Mount Lemmon || Mount Lemmon Survey ||  || align=right | 3.6 km || 
|-id=727 bgcolor=#E9E9E9
| 503727 ||  || — || August 25, 2004 || Kitt Peak || Spacewatch ||  || align=right | 1.5 km || 
|-id=728 bgcolor=#d6d6d6
| 503728 ||  || — || January 13, 2010 || Kitt Peak || Spacewatch || EUP || align=right | 4.3 km || 
|-id=729 bgcolor=#d6d6d6
| 503729 ||  || — || January 16, 2015 || Haleakala || Pan-STARRS ||  || align=right | 2.4 km || 
|-id=730 bgcolor=#d6d6d6
| 503730 ||  || — || January 27, 2010 || WISE || WISE || EUP || align=right | 2.5 km || 
|-id=731 bgcolor=#E9E9E9
| 503731 ||  || — || February 13, 2011 || Mount Lemmon || Mount Lemmon Survey ||  || align=right | 1.7 km || 
|-id=732 bgcolor=#d6d6d6
| 503732 ||  || — || June 12, 2010 || WISE || WISE ||  || align=right | 3.2 km || 
|-id=733 bgcolor=#d6d6d6
| 503733 ||  || — || February 9, 2010 || Kitt Peak || Spacewatch ||  || align=right | 2.3 km || 
|-id=734 bgcolor=#d6d6d6
| 503734 ||  || — || April 14, 1999 || Kitt Peak || Spacewatch || EOS || align=right | 1.7 km || 
|-id=735 bgcolor=#d6d6d6
| 503735 ||  || — || April 9, 2010 || Mount Lemmon || Mount Lemmon Survey ||  || align=right | 2.4 km || 
|-id=736 bgcolor=#d6d6d6
| 503736 ||  || — || April 20, 2006 || Kitt Peak || Spacewatch ||  || align=right | 2.4 km || 
|-id=737 bgcolor=#d6d6d6
| 503737 ||  || — || January 25, 2009 || Kitt Peak || Spacewatch ||  || align=right | 2.5 km || 
|-id=738 bgcolor=#E9E9E9
| 503738 ||  || — || November 1, 1999 || Kitt Peak || Spacewatch || WIT || align=right | 2.1 km || 
|-id=739 bgcolor=#E9E9E9
| 503739 ||  || — || September 20, 1995 || Kitt Peak || Spacewatch ||  || align=right | 1.1 km || 
|-id=740 bgcolor=#d6d6d6
| 503740 ||  || — || May 2, 2005 || Kitt Peak || Spacewatch || URS || align=right | 3.0 km || 
|-id=741 bgcolor=#fefefe
| 503741 ||  || — || November 26, 2003 || Kitt Peak || Spacewatch ||  || align=right data-sort-value="0.84" | 840 m || 
|-id=742 bgcolor=#d6d6d6
| 503742 ||  || — || November 5, 2007 || Mount Lemmon || Mount Lemmon Survey ||  || align=right | 2.8 km || 
|-id=743 bgcolor=#E9E9E9
| 503743 ||  || — || September 10, 2004 || Kitt Peak || Spacewatch ||  || align=right | 1.4 km || 
|-id=744 bgcolor=#d6d6d6
| 503744 ||  || — || November 27, 2013 || Haleakala || Pan-STARRS ||  || align=right | 2.5 km || 
|-id=745 bgcolor=#d6d6d6
| 503745 ||  || — || September 14, 2006 || Kitt Peak || Spacewatch ||  || align=right | 3.1 km || 
|-id=746 bgcolor=#fefefe
| 503746 ||  || — || December 31, 2007 || Mount Lemmon || Mount Lemmon Survey ||  || align=right data-sort-value="0.75" | 750 m || 
|-id=747 bgcolor=#d6d6d6
| 503747 ||  || — || January 25, 2009 || Kitt Peak || Spacewatch || EUP || align=right | 3.2 km || 
|-id=748 bgcolor=#E9E9E9
| 503748 ||  || — || March 26, 2011 || Haleakala || Pan-STARRS ||  || align=right | 3.3 km || 
|-id=749 bgcolor=#d6d6d6
| 503749 ||  || — || July 28, 2011 || Haleakala || Pan-STARRS ||  || align=right | 2.5 km || 
|-id=750 bgcolor=#E9E9E9
| 503750 ||  || — || October 6, 2008 || Catalina || CSS ||  || align=right | 2.1 km || 
|-id=751 bgcolor=#E9E9E9
| 503751 ||  || — || April 11, 2007 || Catalina || CSS ||  || align=right | 1.7 km || 
|-id=752 bgcolor=#d6d6d6
| 503752 ||  || — || April 6, 2005 || Mount Lemmon || Mount Lemmon Survey ||  || align=right | 2.4 km || 
|-id=753 bgcolor=#E9E9E9
| 503753 ||  || — || December 22, 2005 || Kitt Peak || Spacewatch || EUN || align=right | 1.9 km || 
|-id=754 bgcolor=#E9E9E9
| 503754 ||  || — || February 5, 2006 || Mount Lemmon || Mount Lemmon Survey || HNS || align=right | 1.8 km || 
|-id=755 bgcolor=#d6d6d6
| 503755 ||  || — || October 17, 2001 || Kitt Peak || Spacewatch ||  || align=right | 3.0 km || 
|-id=756 bgcolor=#d6d6d6
| 503756 ||  || — || January 2, 2009 || Mount Lemmon || Mount Lemmon Survey ||  || align=right | 3.7 km || 
|-id=757 bgcolor=#d6d6d6
| 503757 ||  || — || February 20, 2014 || Haleakala || Pan-STARRS || URS || align=right | 3.7 km || 
|-id=758 bgcolor=#d6d6d6
| 503758 ||  || — || May 13, 2005 || Kitt Peak || Spacewatch ||  || align=right | 2.3 km || 
|-id=759 bgcolor=#d6d6d6
| 503759 ||  || — || April 27, 2011 || Kitt Peak || Spacewatch ||  || align=right | 2.7 km || 
|-id=760 bgcolor=#d6d6d6
| 503760 ||  || — || May 14, 2005 || Kitt Peak || Spacewatch ||  || align=right | 2.7 km || 
|-id=761 bgcolor=#d6d6d6
| 503761 ||  || — || February 10, 2008 || Mount Lemmon || Mount Lemmon Survey || EOS || align=right | 2.7 km || 
|-id=762 bgcolor=#d6d6d6
| 503762 ||  || — || December 28, 2013 || Kitt Peak || Spacewatch ||  || align=right | 3.1 km || 
|-id=763 bgcolor=#d6d6d6
| 503763 ||  || — || December 30, 2007 || Kitt Peak || Spacewatch ||  || align=right | 3.1 km || 
|-id=764 bgcolor=#E9E9E9
| 503764 ||  || — || December 30, 2000 || Socorro || LINEAR ||  || align=right | 1.6 km || 
|-id=765 bgcolor=#d6d6d6
| 503765 ||  || — || November 2, 2007 || Mount Lemmon || Mount Lemmon Survey ||  || align=right | 4.0 km || 
|-id=766 bgcolor=#d6d6d6
| 503766 ||  || — || September 28, 2011 || Mount Lemmon || Mount Lemmon Survey || EOS || align=right | 2.7 km || 
|-id=767 bgcolor=#d6d6d6
| 503767 ||  || — || April 30, 2009 || Kitt Peak || Spacewatch || ELF || align=right | 3.6 km || 
|-id=768 bgcolor=#d6d6d6
| 503768 ||  || — || September 27, 2011 || Mount Lemmon || Mount Lemmon Survey ||  || align=right | 3.6 km || 
|-id=769 bgcolor=#d6d6d6
| 503769 ||  || — || March 14, 2013 || Catalina || CSS || 3:2 || align=right | 5.4 km || 
|-id=770 bgcolor=#d6d6d6
| 503770 ||  || — || November 5, 2007 || Mount Lemmon || Mount Lemmon Survey ||  || align=right | 3.0 km || 
|-id=771 bgcolor=#E9E9E9
| 503771 ||  || — || June 6, 2011 || Haleakala || Pan-STARRS ||  || align=right | 1.1 km || 
|-id=772 bgcolor=#d6d6d6
| 503772 ||  || — || July 28, 2008 || Mount Lemmon || Mount Lemmon Survey || 3:2 || align=right | 4.6 km || 
|-id=773 bgcolor=#d6d6d6
| 503773 ||  || — || September 4, 2011 || Haleakala || Pan-STARRS ||  || align=right | 2.7 km || 
|-id=774 bgcolor=#d6d6d6
| 503774 ||  || — || January 10, 2008 || Kitt Peak || Spacewatch || EOS || align=right | 3.3 km || 
|-id=775 bgcolor=#d6d6d6
| 503775 ||  || — || February 8, 2008 || Mount Lemmon || Mount Lemmon Survey ||  || align=right | 3.2 km || 
|-id=776 bgcolor=#d6d6d6
| 503776 ||  || — || October 8, 2005 || Kitt Peak || Spacewatch ||  || align=right | 2.7 km || 
|-id=777 bgcolor=#d6d6d6
| 503777 ||  || — || September 16, 2006 || Kitt Peak || Spacewatch ||  || align=right | 2.5 km || 
|-id=778 bgcolor=#d6d6d6
| 503778 ||  || — || April 10, 2010 || Kitt Peak || Spacewatch ||  || align=right | 3.1 km || 
|-id=779 bgcolor=#d6d6d6
| 503779 ||  || — || September 4, 2011 || Haleakala || Pan-STARRS ||  || align=right | 3.2 km || 
|-id=780 bgcolor=#d6d6d6
| 503780 ||  || — || November 3, 2007 || Mount Lemmon || Mount Lemmon Survey ||  || align=right | 4.1 km || 
|-id=781 bgcolor=#d6d6d6
| 503781 ||  || — || March 11, 2003 || Kitt Peak || Spacewatch || HYG || align=right | 2.7 km || 
|-id=782 bgcolor=#d6d6d6
| 503782 ||  || — || February 1, 2009 || Mount Lemmon || Mount Lemmon Survey ||  || align=right | 2.8 km || 
|-id=783 bgcolor=#d6d6d6
| 503783 ||  || — || January 31, 2009 || Kitt Peak || Spacewatch ||  || align=right | 2.7 km || 
|-id=784 bgcolor=#d6d6d6
| 503784 ||  || — || October 1, 2005 || Kitt Peak || Spacewatch || VER || align=right | 3.6 km || 
|-id=785 bgcolor=#d6d6d6
| 503785 ||  || — || December 6, 2005 || Kitt Peak || Spacewatch || LIXfast? || align=right | 3.3 km || 
|-id=786 bgcolor=#d6d6d6
| 503786 ||  || — || March 4, 2013 || Haleakala || Pan-STARRS ||  || align=right | 3.6 km || 
|-id=787 bgcolor=#d6d6d6
| 503787 ||  || — || March 31, 2008 || Kitt Peak || Spacewatch ||  || align=right | 2.8 km || 
|-id=788 bgcolor=#d6d6d6
| 503788 ||  || — || December 2, 2005 || Kitt Peak || Spacewatch || EOS || align=right | 4.0 km || 
|-id=789 bgcolor=#fefefe
| 503789 ||  || — || March 20, 2012 || Haleakala || Pan-STARRS || H || align=right data-sort-value="0.62" | 620 m || 
|-id=790 bgcolor=#fefefe
| 503790 ||  || — || March 27, 2004 || Socorro || LINEAR || H || align=right data-sort-value="0.73" | 730 m || 
|-id=791 bgcolor=#fefefe
| 503791 ||  || — || July 29, 2005 || Siding Spring || SSS || H || align=right data-sort-value="0.85" | 850 m || 
|-id=792 bgcolor=#E9E9E9
| 503792 ||  || — || October 1, 2011 || Kitt Peak || Spacewatch ||  || align=right | 2.0 km || 
|-id=793 bgcolor=#fefefe
| 503793 ||  || — || January 20, 2006 || Catalina || CSS || H || align=right data-sort-value="0.83" | 830 m || 
|-id=794 bgcolor=#fefefe
| 503794 ||  || — || September 13, 2007 || Catalina || CSS || H || align=right data-sort-value="0.66" | 660 m || 
|-id=795 bgcolor=#E9E9E9
| 503795 ||  || — || September 2, 2010 || Mount Lemmon || Mount Lemmon Survey ||  || align=right | 1.4 km || 
|-id=796 bgcolor=#E9E9E9
| 503796 ||  || — || February 26, 2008 || Kitt Peak || Spacewatch ||  || align=right | 2.2 km || 
|-id=797 bgcolor=#E9E9E9
| 503797 ||  || — || June 16, 2010 || WISE || WISE || ADE || align=right | 2.6 km || 
|-id=798 bgcolor=#fefefe
| 503798 ||  || — || January 31, 2009 || Kitt Peak || Spacewatch || H || align=right data-sort-value="0.52" | 520 m || 
|-id=799 bgcolor=#E9E9E9
| 503799 ||  || — || December 29, 2011 || Mount Lemmon || Mount Lemmon Survey ||  || align=right | 1.6 km || 
|-id=800 bgcolor=#d6d6d6
| 503800 ||  || — || April 15, 2012 || Haleakala || Pan-STARRS ||  || align=right | 3.1 km || 
|}

503801–503900 

|-bgcolor=#fefefe
| 503801 ||  || — || May 21, 2006 || Mount Lemmon || Mount Lemmon Survey ||  || align=right data-sort-value="0.64" | 640 m || 
|-id=802 bgcolor=#d6d6d6
| 503802 ||  || — || May 22, 2006 || Kitt Peak || Spacewatch ||  || align=right | 3.2 km || 
|-id=803 bgcolor=#E9E9E9
| 503803 ||  || — || January 3, 2016 || Haleakala || Pan-STARRS ||  || align=right | 1.4 km || 
|-id=804 bgcolor=#E9E9E9
| 503804 ||  || — || February 28, 2008 || Mount Lemmon || Mount Lemmon Survey ||  || align=right | 1.1 km || 
|-id=805 bgcolor=#d6d6d6
| 503805 ||  || — || January 14, 2016 || Haleakala || Pan-STARRS ||  || align=right | 3.1 km || 
|-id=806 bgcolor=#fefefe
| 503806 ||  || — || March 26, 2006 || Catalina || CSS || H || align=right data-sort-value="0.89" | 890 m || 
|-id=807 bgcolor=#E9E9E9
| 503807 ||  || — || January 9, 2011 || Mount Lemmon || Mount Lemmon Survey ||  || align=right | 3.1 km || 
|-id=808 bgcolor=#d6d6d6
| 503808 ||  || — || January 8, 2010 || Kitt Peak || Spacewatch ||  || align=right | 2.5 km || 
|-id=809 bgcolor=#fefefe
| 503809 ||  || — || January 19, 2008 || Kitt Peak || Spacewatch || H || align=right data-sort-value="0.76" | 760 m || 
|-id=810 bgcolor=#fefefe
| 503810 ||  || — || September 6, 2012 || Siding Spring || SSS || H || align=right data-sort-value="0.80" | 800 m || 
|-id=811 bgcolor=#E9E9E9
| 503811 ||  || — || November 14, 2010 || La Sagra || OAM Obs. || BRU || align=right | 2.4 km || 
|-id=812 bgcolor=#E9E9E9
| 503812 ||  || — || May 16, 2013 || Mount Lemmon || Mount Lemmon Survey ||  || align=right | 1.1 km || 
|-id=813 bgcolor=#d6d6d6
| 503813 ||  || — || March 20, 2007 || Kitt Peak || Spacewatch || 615 || align=right | 2.2 km || 
|-id=814 bgcolor=#d6d6d6
| 503814 ||  || — || November 18, 2008 || Kitt Peak || Spacewatch || ALA || align=right | 3.2 km || 
|-id=815 bgcolor=#fefefe
| 503815 ||  || — || April 30, 2013 || Mount Lemmon || Mount Lemmon Survey ||  || align=right data-sort-value="0.79" | 790 m || 
|-id=816 bgcolor=#E9E9E9
| 503816 ||  || — || September 18, 2014 || Haleakala || Pan-STARRS ||  || align=right | 1.1 km || 
|-id=817 bgcolor=#fefefe
| 503817 ||  || — || January 4, 2013 || Mount Lemmon || Mount Lemmon Survey ||  || align=right data-sort-value="0.64" | 640 m || 
|-id=818 bgcolor=#fefefe
| 503818 ||  || — || March 31, 2003 || Kitt Peak || Spacewatch ||  || align=right data-sort-value="0.77" | 770 m || 
|-id=819 bgcolor=#d6d6d6
| 503819 ||  || — || May 1, 2000 || Anderson Mesa || LONEOS || TIR || align=right | 3.6 km || 
|-id=820 bgcolor=#d6d6d6
| 503820 ||  || — || April 6, 2010 || WISE || WISE || Tj (2.96) || align=right | 4.2 km || 
|-id=821 bgcolor=#fefefe
| 503821 ||  || — || February 17, 2013 || Mount Lemmon || Mount Lemmon Survey ||  || align=right data-sort-value="0.86" | 860 m || 
|-id=822 bgcolor=#E9E9E9
| 503822 ||  || — || November 1, 2010 || Mount Lemmon || Mount Lemmon Survey ||  || align=right | 1.6 km || 
|-id=823 bgcolor=#E9E9E9
| 503823 ||  || — || July 15, 2013 || Haleakala || Pan-STARRS || GEF || align=right | 2.2 km || 
|-id=824 bgcolor=#fefefe
| 503824 ||  || — || May 11, 2007 || Mount Lemmon || Mount Lemmon Survey ||  || align=right data-sort-value="0.57" | 570 m || 
|-id=825 bgcolor=#d6d6d6
| 503825 ||  || — || October 6, 2008 || Mount Lemmon || Mount Lemmon Survey ||  || align=right | 2.6 km || 
|-id=826 bgcolor=#d6d6d6
| 503826 ||  || — || April 30, 2006 || Kitt Peak || Spacewatch ||  || align=right | 2.6 km || 
|-id=827 bgcolor=#d6d6d6
| 503827 ||  || — || November 26, 2014 || Haleakala || Pan-STARRS ||  || align=right | 2.4 km || 
|-id=828 bgcolor=#fefefe
| 503828 ||  || — || April 20, 2010 || Mount Lemmon || Mount Lemmon Survey ||  || align=right data-sort-value="0.71" | 710 m || 
|-id=829 bgcolor=#E9E9E9
| 503829 ||  || — || March 28, 2012 || Catalina || CSS ||  || align=right | 2.2 km || 
|-id=830 bgcolor=#d6d6d6
| 503830 ||  || — || April 25, 2006 || Kitt Peak || Spacewatch ||  || align=right | 2.9 km || 
|-id=831 bgcolor=#E9E9E9
| 503831 ||  || — || September 15, 2005 || Socorro || LINEAR ||  || align=right | 2.0 km || 
|-id=832 bgcolor=#d6d6d6
| 503832 ||  || — || January 6, 2010 || Kitt Peak || Spacewatch || EOS || align=right | 3.6 km || 
|-id=833 bgcolor=#E9E9E9
| 503833 ||  || — || September 4, 2014 || Haleakala || Pan-STARRS ||  || align=right | 2.6 km || 
|-id=834 bgcolor=#E9E9E9
| 503834 ||  || — || April 19, 2004 || Socorro || LINEAR ||  || align=right | 1.6 km || 
|-id=835 bgcolor=#d6d6d6
| 503835 ||  || — || July 18, 2007 || Mount Lemmon || Mount Lemmon Survey ||  || align=right | 2.4 km || 
|-id=836 bgcolor=#fefefe
| 503836 ||  || — || December 4, 2007 || Mount Lemmon || Mount Lemmon Survey ||  || align=right data-sort-value="0.89" | 890 m || 
|-id=837 bgcolor=#E9E9E9
| 503837 ||  || — || April 14, 2008 || Mount Lemmon || Mount Lemmon Survey ||  || align=right | 1.6 km || 
|-id=838 bgcolor=#d6d6d6
| 503838 ||  || — || April 19, 2010 || WISE || WISE ||  || align=right | 3.4 km || 
|-id=839 bgcolor=#E9E9E9
| 503839 ||  || — || June 27, 2005 || Kitt Peak || Spacewatch || KAZ || align=right | 1.0 km || 
|-id=840 bgcolor=#E9E9E9
| 503840 ||  || — || November 18, 1995 || Kitt Peak || Spacewatch ||  || align=right | 3.0 km || 
|-id=841 bgcolor=#d6d6d6
| 503841 ||  || — || December 29, 2003 || Kitt Peak || Spacewatch || ALA || align=right | 3.6 km || 
|-id=842 bgcolor=#fefefe
| 503842 ||  || — || April 2, 2006 || Kitt Peak || Spacewatch || NYS || align=right data-sort-value="0.85" | 850 m || 
|-id=843 bgcolor=#fefefe
| 503843 ||  || — || March 10, 2002 || Kitt Peak || Spacewatch ||  || align=right data-sort-value="0.82" | 820 m || 
|-id=844 bgcolor=#E9E9E9
| 503844 ||  || — || April 14, 2008 || Mount Lemmon || Mount Lemmon Survey ||  || align=right | 1.4 km || 
|-id=845 bgcolor=#fefefe
| 503845 ||  || — || May 18, 2010 || WISE || WISE ||  || align=right data-sort-value="0.83" | 830 m || 
|-id=846 bgcolor=#d6d6d6
| 503846 ||  || — || January 22, 2015 || Haleakala || Pan-STARRS ||  || align=right | 3.2 km || 
|-id=847 bgcolor=#E9E9E9
| 503847 ||  || — || July 3, 2000 || Kitt Peak || Spacewatch ||  || align=right | 1.0 km || 
|-id=848 bgcolor=#FA8072
| 503848 ||  || — || September 24, 1960 || Palomar || PLS ||  || align=right data-sort-value="0.63" | 630 m || 
|-id=849 bgcolor=#fefefe
| 503849 ||  || — || September 29, 1973 || Palomar || PLS ||  || align=right data-sort-value="0.66" | 660 m || 
|-id=850 bgcolor=#fefefe
| 503850 ||  || — || October 16, 1977 || Palomar || PLS ||  || align=right data-sort-value="0.81" | 810 m || 
|-id=851 bgcolor=#E9E9E9
| 503851 ||  || — || October 15, 1995 || Kitt Peak || Spacewatch ||  || align=right | 1.2 km || 
|-id=852 bgcolor=#d6d6d6
| 503852 ||  || — || October 15, 1995 || Kitt Peak || Spacewatch ||  || align=right | 2.8 km || 
|-id=853 bgcolor=#d6d6d6
| 503853 ||  || — || November 14, 1995 || Kitt Peak || Spacewatch ||  || align=right | 2.8 km || 
|-id=854 bgcolor=#d6d6d6
| 503854 ||  || — || September 5, 1996 || Kitt Peak || Spacewatch ||  || align=right | 2.8 km || 
|-id=855 bgcolor=#fefefe
| 503855 ||  || — || September 20, 1996 || Kitt Peak || Spacewatch || H || align=right data-sort-value="0.59" | 590 m || 
|-id=856 bgcolor=#d6d6d6
| 503856 ||  || — || October 10, 1996 || Kitt Peak || Spacewatch ||  || align=right | 2.6 km || 
|-id=857 bgcolor=#d6d6d6
| 503857 ||  || — || November 5, 1996 || Kitt Peak || Spacewatch ||  || align=right | 1.7 km || 
|-id=858 bgcolor=#C2E0FF
| 503858 ||  || — || April 28, 1998 || Mauna Kea || C. Trujillo, D. J. Tholen, D. C. Jewitt, J. X. Luu || plutino || align=right | 77 km || 
|-id=859 bgcolor=#FA8072
| 503859 ||  || — || August 26, 1998 || Kitt Peak || Spacewatch ||  || align=right data-sort-value="0.57" | 570 m || 
|-id=860 bgcolor=#fefefe
| 503860 ||  || — || October 12, 1998 || Kitt Peak || Spacewatch || H || align=right data-sort-value="0.70" | 700 m || 
|-id=861 bgcolor=#FFC2E0
| 503861 ||  || — || November 16, 1998 || Socorro || LINEAR || APOPHA || align=right data-sort-value="0.38" | 380 m || 
|-id=862 bgcolor=#fefefe
| 503862 ||  || — || January 19, 1999 || Kitt Peak || Spacewatch ||  || align=right data-sort-value="0.64" | 640 m || 
|-id=863 bgcolor=#E9E9E9
| 503863 ||  || — || September 21, 1999 || Prescott || P. G. Comba ||  || align=right | 2.4 km || 
|-id=864 bgcolor=#FA8072
| 503864 ||  || — || September 29, 1999 || Catalina || CSS ||  || align=right data-sort-value="0.56" | 560 m || 
|-id=865 bgcolor=#FFC2E0
| 503865 ||  || — || November 6, 1999 || Socorro || LINEAR || AMO || align=right data-sort-value="0.26" | 260 m || 
|-id=866 bgcolor=#E9E9E9
| 503866 ||  || — || November 1, 1999 || Kitt Peak || Spacewatch ||  || align=right | 1.4 km || 
|-id=867 bgcolor=#E9E9E9
| 503867 ||  || — || November 6, 1999 || Kitt Peak || Spacewatch ||  || align=right | 1.6 km || 
|-id=868 bgcolor=#fefefe
| 503868 ||  || — || January 3, 2000 || Socorro || LINEAR || H || align=right data-sort-value="0.85" | 850 m || 
|-id=869 bgcolor=#fefefe
| 503869 ||  || — || April 5, 2000 || Socorro || LINEAR ||  || align=right data-sort-value="0.84" | 840 m || 
|-id=870 bgcolor=#E9E9E9
| 503870 ||  || — || August 30, 2000 || Kitt Peak || Spacewatch ||  || align=right data-sort-value="0.78" | 780 m || 
|-id=871 bgcolor=#FFC2E0
| 503871 ||  || — || September 17, 2000 || Socorro || LINEAR || APO +1km || align=right data-sort-value="0.81" | 810 m || 
|-id=872 bgcolor=#E9E9E9
| 503872 ||  || — || September 23, 2000 || Socorro || LINEAR ||  || align=right | 1.3 km || 
|-id=873 bgcolor=#E9E9E9
| 503873 ||  || — || September 2, 2000 || Socorro || LINEAR ||  || align=right | 1.4 km || 
|-id=874 bgcolor=#FA8072
| 503874 ||  || — || September 28, 2000 || Socorro || LINEAR ||  || align=right data-sort-value="0.54" | 540 m || 
|-id=875 bgcolor=#E9E9E9
| 503875 ||  || — || September 22, 2000 || Anderson Mesa || LONEOS ||  || align=right | 1.6 km || 
|-id=876 bgcolor=#E9E9E9
| 503876 ||  || — || September 26, 2000 || Haleakala || NEAT ||  || align=right | 1.8 km || 
|-id=877 bgcolor=#E9E9E9
| 503877 ||  || — || September 29, 2000 || Xinglong || SCAP ||  || align=right | 1.1 km || 
|-id=878 bgcolor=#d6d6d6
| 503878 ||  || — || September 22, 2000 || Socorro || LINEAR ||  || align=right | 4.0 km || 
|-id=879 bgcolor=#FA8072
| 503879 ||  || — || October 24, 2000 || Socorro || LINEAR ||  || align=right data-sort-value="0.95" | 950 m || 
|-id=880 bgcolor=#FFC2E0
| 503880 ||  || — || December 23, 2000 || Socorro || LINEAR || APO +1km || align=right data-sort-value="0.92" | 920 m || 
|-id=881 bgcolor=#FA8072
| 503881 ||  || — || January 18, 2001 || Socorro || LINEAR ||  || align=right | 1.9 km || 
|-id=882 bgcolor=#E9E9E9
| 503882 ||  || — || January 4, 2001 || Socorro || LINEAR ||  || align=right | 1.5 km || 
|-id=883 bgcolor=#C2E0FF
| 503883 ||  || — || August 19, 2001 || Cerro Tololo || M. W. Buie || res3:5critical || align=right | 118 km || 
|-id=884 bgcolor=#d6d6d6
| 503884 ||  || — || September 17, 2001 || Socorro || LINEAR || Tj (2.99) || align=right | 2.5 km || 
|-id=885 bgcolor=#d6d6d6
| 503885 ||  || — || September 18, 2001 || Anderson Mesa || LONEOS ||  || align=right | 3.7 km || 
|-id=886 bgcolor=#FA8072
| 503886 ||  || — || September 19, 2001 || Socorro || LINEAR || Tj (2.97) || align=right | 1.9 km || 
|-id=887 bgcolor=#d6d6d6
| 503887 ||  || — || October 13, 2001 || Socorro || LINEAR ||  || align=right | 2.9 km || 
|-id=888 bgcolor=#d6d6d6
| 503888 ||  || — || September 21, 2001 || Kitt Peak || Spacewatch ||  || align=right | 2.3 km || 
|-id=889 bgcolor=#fefefe
| 503889 ||  || — || October 11, 2001 || Palomar || NEAT || H || align=right data-sort-value="0.56" | 560 m || 
|-id=890 bgcolor=#d6d6d6
| 503890 ||  || — || October 5, 1996 || Kitt Peak || Spacewatch ||  || align=right | 2.4 km || 
|-id=891 bgcolor=#d6d6d6
| 503891 ||  || — || October 18, 2001 || Desert Eagle || W. K. Y. Yeung ||  || align=right | 2.2 km || 
|-id=892 bgcolor=#FFC2E0
| 503892 ||  || — || October 26, 2001 || Haleakala || NEAT || APOcritical || align=right data-sort-value="0.54" | 540 m || 
|-id=893 bgcolor=#d6d6d6
| 503893 ||  || — || October 17, 2001 || Socorro || LINEAR ||  || align=right | 3.0 km || 
|-id=894 bgcolor=#d6d6d6
| 503894 ||  || — || October 20, 2001 || Socorro || LINEAR ||  || align=right | 2.5 km || 
|-id=895 bgcolor=#fefefe
| 503895 ||  || — || October 18, 2001 || Palomar || NEAT ||  || align=right data-sort-value="0.62" | 620 m || 
|-id=896 bgcolor=#E9E9E9
| 503896 ||  || — || October 21, 2001 || Socorro || LINEAR ||  || align=right data-sort-value="0.73" | 730 m || 
|-id=897 bgcolor=#E9E9E9
| 503897 ||  || — || November 11, 2001 || Kitt Peak || Spacewatch ||  || align=right data-sort-value="0.71" | 710 m || 
|-id=898 bgcolor=#E9E9E9
| 503898 ||  || — || November 19, 2001 || Socorro || LINEAR ||  || align=right data-sort-value="0.82" | 820 m || 
|-id=899 bgcolor=#d6d6d6
| 503899 ||  || — || December 9, 2001 || Socorro || LINEAR ||  || align=right | 2.7 km || 
|-id=900 bgcolor=#d6d6d6
| 503900 ||  || — || December 7, 2001 || Socorro || LINEAR ||  || align=right | 2.4 km || 
|}

503901–504000 

|-bgcolor=#d6d6d6
| 503901 ||  || — || December 14, 2001 || Socorro || LINEAR || TIR || align=right | 2.9 km || 
|-id=902 bgcolor=#d6d6d6
| 503902 ||  || — || December 18, 2001 || Socorro || LINEAR ||  || align=right | 2.6 km || 
|-id=903 bgcolor=#E9E9E9
| 503903 ||  || — || January 14, 2002 || Socorro || LINEAR ||  || align=right data-sort-value="0.71" | 710 m || 
|-id=904 bgcolor=#fefefe
| 503904 ||  || — || December 20, 2001 || Socorro || LINEAR ||  || align=right | 1.1 km || 
|-id=905 bgcolor=#d6d6d6
| 503905 ||  || — || January 22, 2002 || Socorro || LINEAR ||  || align=right | 3.3 km || 
|-id=906 bgcolor=#E9E9E9
| 503906 ||  || — || January 14, 2002 || Kitt Peak || Spacewatch ||  || align=right | 1.6 km || 
|-id=907 bgcolor=#fefefe
| 503907 ||  || — || January 8, 2002 || Socorro || LINEAR ||  || align=right data-sort-value="0.76" | 760 m || 
|-id=908 bgcolor=#E9E9E9
| 503908 ||  || — || February 8, 2002 || Socorro || LINEAR ||  || align=right | 2.1 km || 
|-id=909 bgcolor=#d6d6d6
| 503909 ||  || — || February 7, 2002 || Socorro || LINEAR ||  || align=right | 3.2 km || 
|-id=910 bgcolor=#E9E9E9
| 503910 ||  || — || February 14, 2002 || Kitt Peak || Spacewatch ||  || align=right | 1.6 km || 
|-id=911 bgcolor=#FFC2E0
| 503911 ||  || — || March 21, 2002 || Socorro || LINEAR || APOcritical || align=right data-sort-value="0.12" | 120 m || 
|-id=912 bgcolor=#fefefe
| 503912 ||  || — || March 17, 2002 || Kitt Peak || Spacewatch || H || align=right data-sort-value="0.63" | 630 m || 
|-id=913 bgcolor=#fefefe
| 503913 ||  || — || May 7, 2002 || Kitt Peak || Spacewatch ||  || align=right data-sort-value="0.71" | 710 m || 
|-id=914 bgcolor=#d6d6d6
| 503914 ||  || — || July 29, 2002 || Palomar || NEAT ||  || align=right | 1.9 km || 
|-id=915 bgcolor=#d6d6d6
| 503915 ||  || — || August 27, 2002 || Palomar || NEAT ||  || align=right | 1.7 km || 
|-id=916 bgcolor=#fefefe
| 503916 ||  || — || August 18, 2002 || Palomar || NEAT ||  || align=right data-sort-value="0.53" | 530 m || 
|-id=917 bgcolor=#d6d6d6
| 503917 ||  || — || September 5, 2002 || Socorro || LINEAR || BRA || align=right | 1.8 km || 
|-id=918 bgcolor=#fefefe
| 503918 ||  || — || September 11, 2002 || Palomar || NEAT || NYS || align=right data-sort-value="0.55" | 550 m || 
|-id=919 bgcolor=#d6d6d6
| 503919 ||  || — || September 4, 2002 || Palomar || NEAT ||  || align=right | 2.4 km || 
|-id=920 bgcolor=#fefefe
| 503920 ||  || — || October 13, 2002 || Kitt Peak || Spacewatch ||  || align=right data-sort-value="0.67" | 670 m || 
|-id=921 bgcolor=#d6d6d6
| 503921 ||  || — || October 5, 2002 || Apache Point || SDSS ||  || align=right | 1.8 km || 
|-id=922 bgcolor=#fefefe
| 503922 ||  || — || October 28, 2002 || Socorro || LINEAR ||  || align=right | 1.3 km || 
|-id=923 bgcolor=#d6d6d6
| 503923 ||  || — || November 25, 2002 || Kitt Peak || Spacewatch || 3:2 || align=right | 5.1 km || 
|-id=924 bgcolor=#fefefe
| 503924 ||  || — || December 11, 2002 || Socorro || LINEAR ||  || align=right data-sort-value="0.90" | 900 m || 
|-id=925 bgcolor=#d6d6d6
| 503925 ||  || — || December 31, 2002 || Kitt Peak || Spacewatch ||  || align=right | 3.4 km || 
|-id=926 bgcolor=#d6d6d6
| 503926 ||  || — || January 27, 2003 || Socorro || LINEAR ||  || align=right | 2.3 km || 
|-id=927 bgcolor=#d6d6d6
| 503927 ||  || — || January 28, 2003 || Kitt Peak || Spacewatch ||  || align=right | 2.2 km || 
|-id=928 bgcolor=#FA8072
| 503928 ||  || — || March 6, 2003 || Socorro || LINEAR ||  || align=right data-sort-value="0.37" | 370 m || 
|-id=929 bgcolor=#fefefe
| 503929 ||  || — || May 26, 2003 || Kitt Peak || Spacewatch || H || align=right data-sort-value="0.71" | 710 m || 
|-id=930 bgcolor=#E9E9E9
| 503930 ||  || — || July 3, 2003 || Kitt Peak || Spacewatch ||  || align=right | 1.9 km || 
|-id=931 bgcolor=#fefefe
| 503931 ||  || — || August 20, 2003 || Campo Imperatore || CINEOS ||  || align=right data-sort-value="0.68" | 680 m || 
|-id=932 bgcolor=#E9E9E9
| 503932 ||  || — || August 31, 2003 || Socorro || LINEAR ||  || align=right | 2.0 km || 
|-id=933 bgcolor=#E9E9E9
| 503933 ||  || — || September 18, 2003 || Palomar || NEAT || DOR || align=right | 2.4 km || 
|-id=934 bgcolor=#E9E9E9
| 503934 ||  || — || September 18, 2003 || Palomar || NEAT ||  || align=right | 2.3 km || 
|-id=935 bgcolor=#E9E9E9
| 503935 ||  || — || September 19, 2003 || Kitt Peak || Spacewatch ||  || align=right | 1.5 km || 
|-id=936 bgcolor=#E9E9E9
| 503936 ||  || — || September 21, 2003 || Anderson Mesa || LONEOS ||  || align=right | 2.2 km || 
|-id=937 bgcolor=#E9E9E9
| 503937 ||  || — || September 16, 2003 || Kitt Peak || Spacewatch ||  || align=right | 1.7 km || 
|-id=938 bgcolor=#fefefe
| 503938 ||  || — || September 21, 2003 || Kitt Peak || Spacewatch ||  || align=right data-sort-value="0.45" | 450 m || 
|-id=939 bgcolor=#E9E9E9
| 503939 ||  || — || October 1, 2003 || Kitt Peak || Spacewatch || HOF || align=right | 2.0 km || 
|-id=940 bgcolor=#fefefe
| 503940 ||  || — || October 16, 2003 || Kitt Peak || Spacewatch || H || align=right data-sort-value="0.53" | 530 m || 
|-id=941 bgcolor=#FFC2E0
| 503941 ||  || — || October 21, 2003 || Anderson Mesa || LONEOS || APOPHA || align=right data-sort-value="0.26" | 260 m || 
|-id=942 bgcolor=#fefefe
| 503942 ||  || — || September 30, 2003 || Socorro || LINEAR ||  || align=right data-sort-value="0.61" | 610 m || 
|-id=943 bgcolor=#fefefe
| 503943 ||  || — || October 2, 2003 || Kitt Peak || Spacewatch ||  || align=right data-sort-value="0.54" | 540 m || 
|-id=944 bgcolor=#fefefe
| 503944 ||  || — || October 21, 2003 || Socorro || LINEAR ||  || align=right | 1.1 km || 
|-id=945 bgcolor=#fefefe
| 503945 ||  || — || October 22, 2003 || Kitt Peak || Spacewatch ||  || align=right data-sort-value="0.70" | 700 m || 
|-id=946 bgcolor=#fefefe
| 503946 ||  || — || September 28, 2003 || Kitt Peak || Spacewatch ||  || align=right data-sort-value="0.56" | 560 m || 
|-id=947 bgcolor=#fefefe
| 503947 ||  || — || October 16, 2003 || Anderson Mesa || LONEOS ||  || align=right data-sort-value="0.65" | 650 m || 
|-id=948 bgcolor=#fefefe
| 503948 ||  || — || October 17, 2003 || Kitt Peak || Spacewatch ||  || align=right data-sort-value="0.78" | 780 m || 
|-id=949 bgcolor=#fefefe
| 503949 ||  || — || October 21, 2003 || Palomar || NEAT || NYS || align=right data-sort-value="0.48" | 480 m || 
|-id=950 bgcolor=#fefefe
| 503950 ||  || — || November 19, 2003 || Socorro || LINEAR || PHO || align=right | 1.5 km || 
|-id=951 bgcolor=#d6d6d6
| 503951 ||  || — || November 26, 2003 || Kitt Peak || Spacewatch ||  || align=right | 2.7 km || 
|-id=952 bgcolor=#fefefe
| 503952 ||  || — || December 3, 2003 || Socorro || LINEAR ||  || align=right data-sort-value="0.90" | 900 m || 
|-id=953 bgcolor=#fefefe
| 503953 ||  || — || December 29, 2003 || Kitt Peak || Spacewatch ||  || align=right data-sort-value="0.72" | 720 m || 
|-id=954 bgcolor=#d6d6d6
| 503954 ||  || — || March 15, 2004 || Kitt Peak || Spacewatch ||  || align=right | 2.5 km || 
|-id=955 bgcolor=#fefefe
| 503955 ||  || — || March 15, 2004 || Kitt Peak || Spacewatch || SUL || align=right | 1.9 km || 
|-id=956 bgcolor=#fefefe
| 503956 ||  || — || July 11, 2004 || Socorro || LINEAR || H || align=right data-sort-value="0.60" | 600 m || 
|-id=957 bgcolor=#E9E9E9
| 503957 ||  || — || August 6, 2004 || Campo Imperatore || CINEOS ||  || align=right | 1.1 km || 
|-id=958 bgcolor=#E9E9E9
| 503958 ||  || — || August 7, 2004 || Palomar || NEAT || BAR || align=right | 1.2 km || 
|-id=959 bgcolor=#E9E9E9
| 503959 ||  || — || August 7, 2004 || Palomar || NEAT ||  || align=right | 1.4 km || 
|-id=960 bgcolor=#FFC2E0
| 503960 ||  || — || August 19, 2004 || Socorro || LINEAR || APO +1km || align=right data-sort-value="0.78" | 780 m || 
|-id=961 bgcolor=#E9E9E9
| 503961 ||  || — || August 23, 2004 || Kitt Peak || Spacewatch ||  || align=right | 1.1 km || 
|-id=962 bgcolor=#E9E9E9
| 503962 ||  || — || August 21, 2004 || Siding Spring || SSS ||  || align=right | 1.5 km || 
|-id=963 bgcolor=#E9E9E9
| 503963 ||  || — || September 7, 2004 || Kitt Peak || Spacewatch ||  || align=right | 1.1 km || 
|-id=964 bgcolor=#E9E9E9
| 503964 ||  || — || September 8, 2004 || Palomar || NEAT ||  || align=right | 2.3 km || 
|-id=965 bgcolor=#E9E9E9
| 503965 ||  || — || September 8, 2004 || Socorro || LINEAR ||  || align=right | 1.3 km || 
|-id=966 bgcolor=#FFC2E0
| 503966 ||  || — || August 27, 2004 || Socorro || LINEAR || APO +1km || align=right data-sort-value="0.85" | 850 m || 
|-id=967 bgcolor=#E9E9E9
| 503967 ||  || — || September 6, 2004 || Socorro || LINEAR ||  || align=right | 1.8 km || 
|-id=968 bgcolor=#E9E9E9
| 503968 ||  || — || August 22, 2004 || Kitt Peak || Spacewatch ||  || align=right | 1.4 km || 
|-id=969 bgcolor=#fefefe
| 503969 ||  || — || September 10, 2004 || Socorro || LINEAR ||  || align=right data-sort-value="0.58" | 580 m || 
|-id=970 bgcolor=#E9E9E9
| 503970 ||  || — || September 11, 2004 || Socorro || LINEAR ||  || align=right | 1.3 km || 
|-id=971 bgcolor=#fefefe
| 503971 ||  || — || September 10, 2004 || Socorro || LINEAR ||  || align=right data-sort-value="0.63" | 630 m || 
|-id=972 bgcolor=#E9E9E9
| 503972 ||  || — || September 11, 2004 || Kitt Peak || Spacewatch ||  || align=right | 1.1 km || 
|-id=973 bgcolor=#fefefe
| 503973 ||  || — || September 13, 2004 || Kitt Peak || Spacewatch ||  || align=right data-sort-value="0.41" | 410 m || 
|-id=974 bgcolor=#E9E9E9
| 503974 ||  || — || September 18, 2004 || Socorro || LINEAR || HNS || align=right | 1.2 km || 
|-id=975 bgcolor=#E9E9E9
| 503975 ||  || — || September 18, 2004 || Socorro || LINEAR || (1547) || align=right | 1.6 km || 
|-id=976 bgcolor=#E9E9E9
| 503976 ||  || — || December 1, 2000 || Kitt Peak || Spacewatch ||  || align=right | 1.3 km || 
|-id=977 bgcolor=#E9E9E9
| 503977 ||  || — || September 15, 2004 || Anderson Mesa || LONEOS ||  || align=right | 1.5 km || 
|-id=978 bgcolor=#E9E9E9
| 503978 ||  || — || September 15, 2004 || Kitt Peak || Spacewatch ||  || align=right | 1.2 km || 
|-id=979 bgcolor=#E9E9E9
| 503979 ||  || — || October 4, 2004 || Kitt Peak || Spacewatch ||  || align=right | 1.2 km || 
|-id=980 bgcolor=#E9E9E9
| 503980 ||  || — || October 5, 2004 || Kitt Peak || Spacewatch ||  || align=right | 1.1 km || 
|-id=981 bgcolor=#fefefe
| 503981 ||  || — || October 5, 2004 || Kitt Peak || Spacewatch ||  || align=right data-sort-value="0.64" | 640 m || 
|-id=982 bgcolor=#E9E9E9
| 503982 ||  || — || October 5, 2004 || Kitt Peak || Spacewatch ||  || align=right | 1.5 km || 
|-id=983 bgcolor=#E9E9E9
| 503983 ||  || — || October 5, 2004 || Kitt Peak || Spacewatch ||  || align=right | 1.2 km || 
|-id=984 bgcolor=#FA8072
| 503984 ||  || — || October 5, 2004 || Kitt Peak || Spacewatch ||  || align=right data-sort-value="0.47" | 470 m || 
|-id=985 bgcolor=#FA8072
| 503985 ||  || — || October 7, 2004 || Socorro || LINEAR ||  || align=right data-sort-value="0.58" | 580 m || 
|-id=986 bgcolor=#E9E9E9
| 503986 ||  || — || September 10, 2004 || Kitt Peak || Spacewatch ||  || align=right | 1.4 km || 
|-id=987 bgcolor=#E9E9E9
| 503987 ||  || — || September 10, 2004 || Kitt Peak || Spacewatch ||  || align=right | 1.3 km || 
|-id=988 bgcolor=#E9E9E9
| 503988 ||  || — || October 7, 2004 || Kitt Peak || Spacewatch ||  || align=right | 1.5 km || 
|-id=989 bgcolor=#E9E9E9
| 503989 ||  || — || October 10, 2004 || Kitt Peak || Spacewatch ||  || align=right | 1.4 km || 
|-id=990 bgcolor=#E9E9E9
| 503990 ||  || — || October 11, 2004 || Palomar || NEAT ||  || align=right | 1.6 km || 
|-id=991 bgcolor=#E9E9E9
| 503991 ||  || — || October 9, 2004 || Kitt Peak || Spacewatch ||  || align=right | 1.9 km || 
|-id=992 bgcolor=#E9E9E9
| 503992 ||  || — || November 3, 2004 || Catalina || CSS ||  || align=right | 2.2 km || 
|-id=993 bgcolor=#E9E9E9
| 503993 ||  || — || November 4, 2004 || Catalina || CSS ||  || align=right | 1.5 km || 
|-id=994 bgcolor=#E9E9E9
| 503994 ||  || — || November 4, 2004 || Catalina || CSS ||  || align=right | 2.0 km || 
|-id=995 bgcolor=#fefefe
| 503995 ||  || — || November 4, 2004 || Anderson Mesa || LONEOS || H || align=right data-sort-value="0.62" | 620 m || 
|-id=996 bgcolor=#fefefe
| 503996 ||  || — || October 8, 2004 || Kitt Peak || Spacewatch || H || align=right data-sort-value="0.62" | 620 m || 
|-id=997 bgcolor=#E9E9E9
| 503997 ||  || — || December 11, 2004 || Kitt Peak || Spacewatch ||  || align=right | 1.2 km || 
|-id=998 bgcolor=#E9E9E9
| 503998 ||  || — || December 10, 2004 || Socorro || LINEAR ||  || align=right | 1.9 km || 
|-id=999 bgcolor=#E9E9E9
| 503999 ||  || — || December 14, 2004 || Kitt Peak || Spacewatch ||  || align=right | 1.2 km || 
|-id=000 bgcolor=#fefefe
| 504000 ||  || — || December 19, 2004 || Mount Lemmon || Mount Lemmon Survey ||  || align=right data-sort-value="0.66" | 660 m || 
|}

References

External links 
 Discovery Circumstances: Numbered Minor Planets (500001)–(505000) (IAU Minor Planet Center)

0503